This is a list of vacuum tubes or thermionic valves, and low-pressure gas-filled tubes, or discharge tubes. Before the advent of semiconductor devices, thousands of tube types were used in consumer electronics. Many industrial, military or otherwise professional tubes were also produced. Only a few types are still used today, mainly in high-power, high-frequency applications.

Heater or filament ratings

Receiving tubes have heaters or filaments intended for direct battery operation, parallel operation off a dedicated winding on a supply transformer, or series string operation on transformer-less sets. High-power RF power tubes are directly heated; the heater voltage must be much smaller than the signal voltage on the grid and is therefore in the 5...25 V range, drawing up to hundreds of amperes from a suitable heater transformer. In some valve part number series, the voltage class of the heater is given in the part number, and a similar valve might be available with several different heater voltage ratings.

Tube bases and envelopes

Abbreviations used in this list
ST – Shouldered tube
GT – Glass tube
MT – Miniature tube, such as Noval B9A or Miniature 7-pin B7G
FL – Subminiature all-glass elliptical body and flat bases with long, inline "flying leads" (wire-ends) that are soldered into the circuit
SL – Subminiature all-glass elliptical body and flat bases with short inline leads that can be soldered or can be mated with a special socket. (Flying leads can be cut short to fit into inline sockets.)
R8 – Subminiature all-glass round body and base with 8 flying leads or stiff pins arranged in a circle

Numbering systems

North American systems

RETMA receiving tubes system

RETMA is the acronym for the Radio Electronic Television Manufacturers Association formed in 1953 - however the standard itself had already been in use since 1933, when RCA/Cunningham introduced the 1A6, 2A3, 2A5, etc.
 The first character group is a number representing the heater voltage rounded to the nearest whole number; 0 indicates a cold-cathode tube.
 One or two letters assigned to the devices in order of development. 
 A single numeral that represents the number of active elements in the tube. 
 Suffix letters distinguish revisions or variants:
A, B, C – Improved backward compatible versions
E – Export version
G – Glass bulb, ST-12 to ST-16 size
GT – Glass bulb, T-9 size 
GT/G – Glass bulb, T-9 size interchangeable with G and GT types
L – Loctal
LM – Loctal-metal
LT – Locking base
M – Metal envelope
MG – Metal-glass
ML – Metal-Loctal
S – Spray shielded
W – Ruggedised, or military grade
WA, WB – Improved, backward compatible military/industrial variants
X – Low loss ceramic base for RF use
Y – Low loss mica-filled phenolic resin ("Micanol") base for RF use
 Lastly, manufacturers may decide to combine two type numbers into a single name, which their one device can replace, such as: 6DX8/ECL84 (6DX8 and ECL84 being identical devices under different naming schemes) or 6BC5/6CE5 (sufficiently identical devices within the RETMA naming system) and even 3A3/3B2, or 6AC5-GT/6AC5-G (where the single type number, 6AC5-GT/6AC5-G, supersedes both the 6AC5-G and the 6AC5-GT).

Often designations that differed only in their initial numerals would be identical except for heater characteristics.

For examples see below

RMA professional tubes system

The system was used in 1942–44 and assigned numbers with the base form "1A21", and is therefore also referred to as the "1A21 system".
The first numeric character indicated the filament/heater power rating, the second alphabetic character was a code for the function, and the last 2 digits were sequentially assigned, beginning with 21

For examples see below.

EIA professional tubes system

A four-digit system was maintained by JETEC since 1944, then by EIA since 1957 for special industrial, military and professional vacuum and gas-filled tubes, and all sorts of other devices requiring to be sealed off against the external atmosphere.

Some manufacturers preceded the EIA number with a manufacturer's code:
CK, RK – Raytheon Company
ECG – Philips/Sylvania
F – Federal Telephone and Radio (ITT division)
GL – General Electric Corp. (not British General Electric Company)
ML – Machlett Laboratories, Inc.
NL – National Electronics, Inc. (Geneva, Illinois, USA)
NU – National Union Electric Corp. (Orange, New Jersey, USA)
PL – Philips N.V.
SV – Svetlana:
formerly only PJSC "Svetlana/ПАО Светлана", St. Petersburg, Russia
now also a brand of New Sensor Corp., Long Island City, New York, USA, manufacturing in Saratov, Russia
WL – Westinghouse Electric Corp.
For examples see below.

Eimac transmitting tubes system
Eitel/McCullough and other manufacturers of high power RF tubes use the following code since 1945:
An initial digit denoting the number of electrodes:
2 – Diode
3 – Triode
4 – Tetrode
5 – Pentode
Up to 2 letters denoting the construction type and the cooling method:
R or a dash ("-") – Glass envelope, radiation cooling
C – Ceramic envelope
K – (Reflex-)Klystron
P – Primarily for pulse applications
L – External anode, liquid convection cooling
N – External anode, natural convection air cooling
S – External anode, conduction cooling
V – Vapor cooled (anode is immersed in boiling water, and the steam is collected, condensed and recycled)
W – Water cooled (water is pumped through an outer metal jacket thermically connected to the anode)
X – Forced-air cooled (air is blown through cooling fins thermally connected to the anode)
A number to indicate the maximum anode dissipation in watts. This can be exceeded for a short time, as long as the average is not exceeded over the anode's thermal time constant (typically 0.1 sec). In Class-C applications, the amplifier output power delivered to the load may be higher than the device dissipation
One or more manufacturer-proprietary letters denoting the construction variant
An optional digit denoting the gain group:
1 – ≤10
2 – 11...20
3 – 21...30
4 – 31...50
5 – 51...100
6 – 101...200
7 – 201...500
8 – 501...1000
Optionally a slash "/" followed by the RMA or EIA equivalent.

Examples:
3CW5000A3 – 5 kW Ceramic triode, water cooled, variant 'A', gain group 3
3CX100A5 – 100 W Ceramic UHF triode, forced-air cooled, variant 'A', gain group 5; often used by radio amateurs for 23cm-band microwave amplifiers.
3CX1500A7 (8877) – 1.5 kW Ceramic triode, forced air cooled, variant 'A', gain group 7
3CX2500A3 – 2.5 kW Ceramic triode, forced air cooled, variant 'A', gain group 3
4-65A (8165) – 65 W Glass beam tetrode
4-125A (4D21, 6155) – 125 W Glass beam tetrode
4-250A (5D22, 6156) – 110 MHz, 250 W Glass beam tetrode
4-400A – 400 W Glass beam tetrode
4-1000A (8166) – 1 kW Glass beam tetrode popular in broadcast and amateur transmitters.
4CX250B – 250 W Ceramic tetrode, forced-air cooled, version 'B', favored by radio amateurs as a final amplifier.
4CX250DC – 250 W Ceramic tetrode, forced-air cooled, version 'DC'
4CX35000 – Ceramic tetrode used in numerous 50-kW broadcast transmitters, forced-air cooled, often in a Doherty configuration as in the Continental Electronics 317C series.
5-125B/4E27A – 75 MHz, 125 W Glass power pentode
5-500A – 500 W Glass radial-beam pentode
5CX1500A – 110 MHz, 1.5 kW Ceramic radial-beam pentode, forced air cooled
5CX3000A – 150 MHz, 4.0 kW Ceramic radial-beam pentode, forced air cooled
5K70SH – 30 kW S-band Klystron

West European systems

Mullard–Philips system

This system is very descriptive of what type of device (triode, diode, pentode etc.) it is applied to, as well as the heater/filament type and the base type (octal, noval, etc.). Adhering manufacturers include AEG (de), Amperex (us), CdL (1921, French Mazda brand), CIFTE (fr, Mazda-Belvu brand), EdiSwan (uk, British Mazda brand), Radiotechnique (fr, Coprim, Miniwatt-Dario and RTC brands), Lorenz (de), MBLE(fr, nl) (be, Adzam brand), Mullard (uk), Philips (nl, Miniwatt brand), RCA (us), RFT(de, sv) (de), Siemens (de), Telefunken (de), Tesla (cz), Toshiba (ja), Tungsram (hu), Unitra (pl, Dolam, Polam and Telam brands) and Valvo(de, it) (de).

Standard tubes
This part dates back to the joint valve code key negotiated between Philips and Telefunken in 1933–34. Like the North American system the first symbol describes the heater voltage, in this case, a Roman letter rather than a number. Further Roman letters, up to three, describe the device followed by one to four numerals assigned in a semi-chronological order of type development within number ranges assigned to different base types.

If two devices share the same type designation other than the first letter (e.g. ECL82, PCL82, UCL82) they will usually be identical except for heater specifications; however there are exceptions, particularly with output types (for example, both the PL84 and UL84 differ significantly from the EL84 in certain major characteristics, although they have the same pinout and similar power rating). However, device numbers do not reveal any similarity between different type families; e.g. the triode section of an ECL82 is not related to either triode of an ECC82, whereas the triode section of an ECL86 does happen to be similar to those of an ECC83.

Pro Electron maintained a subset of the M-P system after their establishment in 1966, with only the first letters E, P for the heater, only the second letters A, B, C, D, E, F, H, K, L, M, Y, Z for the type, and issuing only three-digit numbers starting with 1, 2, 3, 5, 8, 9 for the base.

Notes: Tungsram preceded the M-P designation with the letter T, as in TAD1 for AD1; VATEA Rádiótechnikai és Villamossági Rt.-t. (VATEA Radio Technology and Electric Co. Ltd., Budapest, Hungary) preceded the M-P designation with the letter V, as in VEL5 for EL5.

First letter: heater/filament type
Heater ratings for series-string, AC/DC tubes are given in milliamperes; heater ratings for parallel-string tubes are given in volts

A – 4 V heater for 2-cell lead-acid batteries and for AC mains transformers
B – 180 mA DC series heater
C – 200 mA AC/DC series heater
D – 1.4 V DC filament for Leclanché cells, later low-voltage/low power filament/heater:
0.625 V DC directly heated for NiCd battery, series-heated two-tube designs such as hearing aids. If either filament breaks, further draining of all batteries stops
Wide range 0.9 V to 1.55 V DC directly heated for dry cells
1.25 V DC directly heated for NiCd batteries
1.25 V or 1.4 V AC from a separate heater winding on CRT horizontal-output transformers, in half-indirectly heated EHT rectifiers
E – 6.3 V parallel heater; for 3-cell lead-acid vehicle crank batteries (mobile equipment) and for AC mains or horizontal-output transformers
F – 12.6 V DC parallel heater for 6-cell lead-acid vehicle crank batteries
G – Various heaters between 2.5 and 5.0 V AC (except 4 V) from a separate heater winding on a mains or horizontal-output transformer for the anode voltage rectifier
H – 150 mA AC/DC series heater
Until at least 1938: 4 V battery (as opposed to A for "4 V AC"; no known examples assigned)
I – 20 V heater
K – 2.0 V filament for 1-cell lead-acid batteries, later for AC transformers
L – 450 mA AC/DC series heater; was shifted here from Y
M – 1.9 V, directly heated
N – 12.6 V, indirectly heated
O – Cold cathode
by 1955 this also included semiconductors as these had no heater
Philips sold a family of 150mA series heater tubes under this letter in South America
P – 300 mA AC/DC series heater
Q – 2.4 V, indirectly heated
R – Not assigned to avoid any confusion with the older Telefunken "R" system
S – 1.9 V, indirectly heated
T – Custom heater
U – 100 mA AC/DC series heater
V – 50 mA AC/DC series heater
X – 600 mA AC/DC series heater
Y – 450 mA AC/DC series heater, shifted to L to avoid conflicts with the professional tubes system
Z – Cold cathode tube; was shifted here from O after the advent of semiconductors

Second and subsequent letters: system type
<none> or R – Resistive element (ballast tube, barretter, photoresistor)
A – Small signal diode
B – Dual small signal diode
C – Small signal triode
D – Power output triode
E – Small signal tetrode
F – Small signal pentode
H – Mixer hexode, special purpose heptode
K – Mixer heptode or octode
L – Power output, beam tetrode or pentode
M – Optical tuning/level indicator
N – Noble-gas Thyratron
P – Secondary emission tube – mostly used as third letter
Q – Nonode
S – Special tube
T – Beam deflection tube, or misc.
W – Gas-filled half-wave rectifier
X – Gas-filled full-wave rectifier
Y – Vacuum half-wave rectifier (power diode)
Z – Vacuum full-wave rectifier (dual power diode with common cathode)

Following digits: model number and base type
For signal pentodes, an odd model number most often identified a variable-mu (remote-cutoff) tube, whereas an even number identified a 'high slope' (sharp-cutoff) tube
For power pentodes and triode-pentode combinations, even numbers usually indicate linear (audio power amplifier) devices while odd numbers were more suited to video signals or situations where more distortion could be tolerated.

1–9 – Pinch-type construction tubes, mostly P8A side-contact 8-pin bases (P base) or V5A side-contact 5-pin (V base) and various other European pre-octal designs
10–19 – Y8A 8-pin steel tube base, aka "German metal octal"
20–29 – Loctal B8G; some octal; some 8-way side contact (exceptions are DAC21, DBC21, DCH21, DF21, DF22, DL21, DLL21, DM21 which have octal bases)
30–39 – International Octal (IEC 67-I-5a), also known as IO or K8A
40–49 – Rimlok (Rimlock) B8A All-glass miniature tubes
41w – Battery-heated bowl tube
50–59 – "Special construction types fitted with bases applicable to design features used"; mostly locking bases: "9-pin Loctal" (B9G) or 8-pin Loctal (B8G); but also used for Octal and others (3-pin glass; Disk-seal incl. Lighthouse tubes; German 10-pin with spigot; min. 4-pin; B26A; Magnoval B9D)
60–69 – Pencil tubes – sub-miniature all-glass tubes, wire-ended (inline fly-leads in place of pins)
—Before the 1950s:
60–64 – All-glass tubes fitted with 9-pin Loctal (B9G) bases
70–79 – Pencil tubes with circular pins or fly-leads
—Before the 1950s:
70–79 – 8-pin Loctal (Lorenz)
80–89 – Noval B9A (9-pin; IEC 67-I-12a)
90–99 – "Button" B7G (miniature 7-pin; IEC 67-I-10a)
100–109 – B7G; Wehrmacht base; German PTT base
110–119 – Y8A 8-pin steel tube base; Rimlock B8A
130–139 – Octal
150–159 – German 10-pin with spigot; 10-pin glass with one big pin; Octal
160–169 – Inline wire-ended Pencil tubes; Y8A 8-pin steel tube base
170–179 – RFT 8-pin; RFT 11-pin all-glass gnome tube with one offset pin
180–189 – Noval B9A
190–199 – Miniature 7-pin B7G
200–209 – Decal B10B
230–239 – Octal
270–279 – RFT 11-pin all glass with one offset pin
280–289 – Noval B9A
300–399 – Octal
400–499 – Rimlock B8A
500–529 – Magnoval B9D
600–699 – Inline wire-ended Pencil tubes
700–799 – Circular wire-ended Pencil tubes
800–899 – Noval B9A
900–999 – Miniature 7-pin B7G
—Special quality:
1000– Round wire-ended; special Nuvistor base
2000– Decal B10B
3000– Octal
5000– Magnoval B9D
8000– Noval B9A

For examples see below

Special quality tubes
Vacuum tubes which had special qualities of some sort, very often long-life designs, particularly for computer and telecommunications use, had the numeric part of the designation placed immediately after the first letter. They were usually special-quality versions of standard types. Thus the E82CC was a long-life version of the ECC82 intended for computer and general signal use, and the E88CC a high quality version of the ECC88/6DJ8. While the E80F pentode was a high quality development of the EF80, they were not pin-compatible and could not be interchanged without rewiring the socket (the E80F is commonly sought after as a high quality replacement for the similar EF86 type in guitar amplifiers). The letters "CC" indicated the two triodes and the "F", the single pentode inside these types.

A few special-quality tubes did not have a standard equivalent, e.g. the E55L, a broadband power pentode used as the output stage of oscilloscope amplifiers and the E90CC, a dual triode with a common cathode connection and seven pin base for use in cathode-coupled Flip-flops in early computers. The E91H is a special heptode with a passivated third grid designed to reduce secondary emission; this device was used as a "gate", allowing or blocking pulses applied to the first, (control) grid by changing the voltage on the third grid, in early computer circuits (similar in function to the U.S. 6AS6).

Many of these types had gold-plated base pins and special heater configurations inside the nickel cathode tube designed to reduce hum pickup from the A.C. heater supply, and also had improved oxide insulation between the heater and cathode so the cathode could be elevated to a greater voltage above the heater supply. (Note that elevating the cathode voltage above the average heater voltage, which in well-designed equipment was supplied from a transformer with an earthed center-tapped secondary, was less detrimental to the oxide insulation between heater and cathode than lowering the cathode voltage below the heater voltage, helping to prevent pyrometallurgical electrolytic chemical reactions where the oxide touched the nickel cathode that could form conductive aluminium tungstate and which could ultimately develop into a heater-cathode short circuit.)

Better, often dual, getters were implemented to maintain a better vacuum, and more-rigid electrode supports introduced to reduce microphonics and improve vibration and shock resistance. The mica spacers used in "SQ" and "PQ" types did not possess sharp protrusions which could flake off and become loose inside the bulb, possibly lodging between the grids and thus changing the characteristics of the device. Some types, particularly the E80F, E88CC and E90CC, had a constricted section of bulb to firmly hold specially shaped flakeless mica spacers.

For examples see below, starting at DC

Later  special-quality tubes had not base and function swapped but were assigned a 4-digit number, such as ECC2000 or ED8000, the first digit of which again denoting the base:
1 – Miscellaneous
2 – 10-pin Decal base (JEDEC E10-61)
3 – Octal base (IEC 67-1-5a)
5 – Magnoval base (JEDEC E9-23)
8 – Noval base (IEC 67-1-12a)
9 – Miniature 7-pin base (IEC 67-1-10a)

For examples see below, starting at EC

"Z" Cold-cathode SQ tubes had a different function letter scheme:
A – Arc discharge tube
B – Binary counter or switching tube
C – Common-cathode Counter Dekatron that makes only carry/borrow cathodes separately available for cascading
E – Electrometer tube
G – Gating tube
M – Optical indicator
S – Separate-cathode Counter/Selector Dekatron that makes all cathodes available on individual pins for displaying, divide-by-n counter/timer/prescalers, etc.
T – Relay triode, a low-power triode thyratron, one starter electrode, may need illumination for proper operation if not radioactively primed
U – Low-power tetrode thyratron, may mean:
Trigger tetrode, one starter electrode and a primer (keep-alive) electrode for ion availability to keep the ignition voltage constant, for analog RC timers, voltage triggers, etc.
Relay tetrode, two starter electrodes to make counters bidirectional or resettable
W – Trigger pentode, two starter electrodes and a primer electrode
X – Shielded Trigger pentode, two starter electrodes, a primer electrode and a conductive coating of the glass envelope inside connected to a separate pin

For examples, see below under Z

Professional tubes
In use since at least 1961, this system was maintained by Pro Electron after their establishment in 1966.

Both letters together indicate the type:
X – High vacuum electro-optical devices
XA – Phototube
XG – Miscellaneous
XM – Character generating cathode ray tube
XP – Photomultiplier
XQ – Camera tube
XR – Monoscope
XS – Cathode ray charge storage tube
XT – Memory display tube
XV – Infrared detector
XW – Infrared imaging device
XX – Image intensifier or image converter
Y – Vacuum tubes
YA – Diode
YD – Transmitting or industrial, single or dual triode
YG – Electrometer tube, vacuum gauge
YH – Traveling-wave tube
YJ – Magnetron
YK – Klystron
YL – Transmitting or industrial, single or dual tetrode or pentode
YN – Backward-wave oscillator
YP – Electron multiplier
YR – Crossed-field amplifier
YT – Pulse modulator tube
YY – High vacuum rectifier
Z – Gas-filled tubes not employing photosensitive materials
ZA – Cold cathode indicator tube
ZB – Microwave switching tube (TR/ATR cells, etc.)
ZC – Trigger tube
ZD – Surge arrester
ZE – Glow modulator tube, a linear light source for rotating-drum FAX receivers, film soundtrack recording, etc.
ZF – Flash tube
ZL – Gas laser
ZM – Cold cathode character display tube or counter display tube
ZP – Radiation counter tube (Geiger-Müller counter tube or proportional counter tube)
ZQ – Mixed analogue and digital display
ZR – Plasma display panel
ZS – Bar graph
ZT – Thyratron
ZX – Ignitron
ZY – Mercury-vapor rectifier
ZZ – Voltage stabilizer or corona discharge tube

Then follows a 4-digit sequentially assigned number.

Optional suffixes for camera tubes:

Version letter:
B – Blue
G – Green
L – Luminance
R – Red
T – Reticule
X – Medical X-ray

Letter for variants derived by selection:
D – High resolution
M – Blemish standard

For examples see below

Transmitting tubes
The first letter (or letter pair, in the case of a dual-system device) indicates the general type:
B – Backward-wave amplifier
D – Rectifier, including grid-controlled types
J – Magnetron
K – Klystron
L – Traveling-wave tube
M – Triode (AF amplifier or modulator)
P – Pentode
Q – Tetrode
R – Rectifier, including grid-controlled types
T – Triode (RF, oscillator)
X – Large thyratron (including all hydrogen thyratrons and high-current types)

The following letter indicates the filament or cathode type, or the fill gas or other construction detail. The coding for vacuum devices differs between Philips (and other Continental European manufacturers) on the one hand and its Mullard subsidiary on the other.
Philips vacuum devices:
A
Microwave tubes: Output power <1W
Other tubes: Directly heated tungsten filament
B
Microwave tubes: Output power ≥1W
Other tubes: Directly heated thoriated tungsten filament
C – Directly heated oxide-coated filament
D – Disk-seal construction
E – Indirectly heated oxide-coated cathode

Mullard vacuum devices:
G – Directly heated oxide-coated filament (only mercury-vapor rectifiers)
N – External magnet required (magnetrons)
P – Packaged construction (magnetrons)
S – Reflex klystron
T – Multiple resonator (klystrons)
V – Indirectly heated oxide-coated cathode
X – Directly heated tungsten filament
Y – Directly heated thoriated tungsten filament
Z – Directly heated oxide-coated filament (except mercury-vapor rectifiers)

Gas-filled devices:
G – Mercury-vapor filling
H – Hydrogen filling
R – Rare-gas filling
X – Xenon filling

The next letter indicates the cooling method or other significant characteristic:
H – Helix or other integral cooler
L – Forced-air cooling
Q – Shield-grid (tetrode) thyratron (thyratrons only)
S – Silica envelope, to allow for a glowing anode
T – Tunable microwave device
W – Water cooling

The following group of digits indicate:
Microwave tubes: Frequency in GHz
Rectifying tubes: DC output voltage in kV in a three-phase half-wave configuration
Thyratrons: Peak inverse voltage in kV
Transmitting tubes: Maximum anode voltage in kV

The following group of digits indicate the power:
Backward-wave amplifier or Traveling-wave tube: Output power
2nd letter: A – in mW
2nd letter: B – in W
Klystrons: Output power in W
Reflex Klystrons: Output power in mW
Magnetrons: Pulse output power in kW
Continuously transmitting tubes: Maximum anode dissipation in W or kW in Class-C amplifier telegraphy
Pulsed transmitting tubes: Maximum peak anode current in A (number preceded by "P")
Rectifiers: Maximum average anode current in mA
Thyratrons: Maximum average anode current:
Less than 3 digits: in mA
3 or more digits:
1st digit: =0 – in mA
1st digit: >0 – in A

An optional following letter indicates the base or connection method:
B – Cables
E – Medium 7-pin base
ED – Edison screw lamp base
EG – Goliath lamp base
F – Medium 8-pin base
G – Medium 4-pin base
GB – Jumbo 4-pin base
GS – Super jumbo 4-pin base
N – Medium 5-pin base
P – Side-contact 8-pin base

For examples see below

Phototubes and photomultipliers
The first digit indicates the tube base:
2 – Loctal 8-pin base
3 – Octal base
5, 6 – Special base or flying leads
8 – Noval base
9 – Miniature 7-pin base

The second digit is a sequentially assigned number.

The following letter indicates the photocathode type:
A – Caesium-activated antimony cathode. Used for reflective-mode photocathodes. Response range from ultraviolet to visible. Widely used.
C – Caesium-on-oxidated-silver cathode, also called S1. Transmission-mode, sensitive from 300...1200 nm. High dark current; used mainly in near-infrared, with the photocathode cooled.
T – Trialkali sodium-potassium-antimony-caesium cathode, wide spectral response from ultraviolet to near-infrared; special cathode processing can extend range to 930 nm. Used in broadband spectrophotometers.
U – Caesium-antimony cathode with a quartz window

The following letter indicates the filling:
G – Gas-filled
V – High-vacuum

A following letter P indicates a photomultiplier.

Examples:
50AVP – 11-stage photomultiplier for scintillation counters, duodecal base
51UVP – 11-stage photomultiplier, duodecal base
52AVP/XP1180 – 10-stage photomultiplier, 13-pin base
53AVP, 153AVP – 10-stage photomultiplier, diheptal 14-pin base
53UVP – 11-stage photomultiplier, diheptal 14-pin base
54AVP – 11-stage photomultiplier, diheptal 14-pin base
55AVP – 15-stage photomultiplier, bidecal 20-pin base
56AVP – 14-stage photomultiplier, bidecal 20-pin base
56UVP – 14-stage photomultiplier, duodecal base
57AVP – 11-stage photomultiplier, bidecal 20-pin base
58AVP – 14-stage photomultiplier, bidecal 20-pin base
150AVP – 10-stage photomultiplier, bidecal 20-pin base
150CVP – 10-stage photomultiplier, bidecal 20-pin base
57CV – Photometric cell
58CG – Gas-filled phototube, Red/IR sensitive, all-glass wire-ended
58CV – Vacuum phototube, Red/IR sensitive, all-glass wire-ended
90AG – Gas-filled phototube, daylight/blue sensitive, miniature 7-pin base
90AV – Vacuum phototube, blue sensitive, miniature 7-pin base
90CG – Gas-filled phototube, Red/IR sensitive, miniature 7-pin base
90CV – Vacuum phototube, Red/IR sensitive, miniature 7-pin base
92AG – Gas-filled phototube, blue sensitive, miniature 7-pin base
92AV – Vacuum phototube, blue sensitive, miniature 7-pin base
61SV/7634 – PbS infrared (300...3500 nm) photoresistor, 2-pin all-glass wire-ended

Voltage stabilizers
The first number indicates the burning voltage

The following letter indicates the current range:
A – max. 10mA
B – max. 22mA
C – max. 40mA
D – max. 100mA
E – max. 200mA

The following digit is a sequentially assigned number.

An optional, following letter indicates the base:

E – Edison screw lamp base
K – Octal base
P – Side-contact 8-pin base

Examples:
75B1 – Voltage reference tube, miniature 7-pin base
75C1 – Voltage reference tube, miniature 7-pin base
83A1 – Voltage reference tube, miniature 7-pin base
85A1/0E3 – Voltage reference tube, B8G Loctal base
85A2/0G3 – Voltage reference tube, miniature 7-pin base
90C1 – Voltage reference tube, miniature 7-pin base
95A1 – Voltage reference tube, miniature 7-pin base
100E1 – Voltage reference tube, A4A European 4-pin Base
108C1/0B2 – Voltage reference tube, miniature 7-pin base
150A1 – Voltage reference tube, P8A side-contact 8 base
150B2 – Voltage reference tube, miniature 7-pin base
150B3 – Voltage reference tube, miniature 7-pin base
150C1 – Voltage reference tube, P8A side-contact 8 base
150C2/0A2 – Voltage reference tube, miniature 7-pin base
150C4 – Voltage reference tube, miniature 7-pin base

Compagnie des Lampes (1888, "Métal") system
The first (1888) incarnation of La Compagnie des Lampes produced the TM tube since 1915 and defined one of the first French systems; not to be confused with Compagnie des Lampes (1921, "French Mazda", see below).

First letter: Heater or filament voltage
A – 1 V
B – 2 V
D – 4 V
E – 5 V
F – 6 V
G – 7 V

Second letter: Heater or filament current
W – ≥200 mA
X – 150 mA
Y – 100...140 mA
Z – 50 mA

Next number: Gain

Next number: Internal resistance in kΩ

Examples:
BW604 – Métal secteur indirectly AC-heated AF power triode
BW1010 – Métal secteur indirectly AC-heated AF triode

EdiSwan ("British Mazda") systems
{| class="wikitable floatright" style="width: 30%;"
|-
| EdiSwan (British Mazda) is not to be confused with other licensees of General Electric's Mazda brand:
 GE's own subsidiary British Thomson-Houston
 Cie des Lampes (1921, French Mazda, see below)
 Cie Industrielle Française des Tubes Electroniques – CIFTE (Mazda-Belvu – originating from Societé Radio Belvu; see below)
 Manufacture Belge des Lampes Électriques,(fr, nl) producing:
 Light bulbs since 1911 under the Belgian Mazda brand
 Electronic tubes since 1924 under the Adzam ("Mazda" spelled backwards) brand
|}
Note: EdiSwan also used the Mullard–Philips scheme.

Signal tubes
First number: Heater or filament rating
0 – Misc. higher voltages
1 – 1.4 V
6 – 6.3 V
10 – 100 mA
20 – 200 mA
30 – 300 mA

Following letter or letter sequence: Type
C – Frequency changer with special oscillator section
D – Signal diode(s)
F – Tetrode or pentode
FD – Tetrode or pentode and diode(s)
FL – Tetrode or pentode, and triode
K – Small gas triode or tetrode thyratron
L – Single or dual triode, including oscillator triode
LD – Triode and diode(s)
M – Optical tuning/level indicator
P – Power tetrode or pentode
PL – Power tetrode or pentode, and signal triode

Final number: Sequentially assigned number

Power tubes

Letter(s): Type

U – High-vacuum half-wave rectifier
UU – High-vacuum full-wave rectifier

Number: Sequentially assigned number

Examples:

Note: "AC/"-series receiver tubes are listed under other letter tubes - AC/
6C10 (6CU7/ECH42) – Triode/hexode frequency converter, Rimlock base
6F22 (6267/EF86) – Low-noise A.F. pentode, noval base
6F33 – Shielded pentode, Miniature 7-pin base
6L12 (6AQ8/ECC85) – Dual triode, noval base
6L19 – Dual triode, Rimlock base
6M2 (6CD7/EM34) – Dual-sensitivity tuning indicator, octal base
6P9 (6BM5) – Power pentode, Miniature 7-pin base
6P15 (6BQ5/EL84) – Power pentode, noval base
10PL12 (50BM8/UCL82) – Triode/power pentode, noval base
U381 (38A3/UY85) – Half-wave rectifier, noval base
UU9 (6BT4/EZ40) – Full-wave rectifier, rimlock base

EEV system
This system consists of one or more letters followed by a sequentially assigned number
A – High vacuum rectifier
AFX – Rare-gas filled triode thyratron
AH – Mercury-vapor rectifier
AX – Xenon filled rectifier
B – Radiation-cooled triode
BD – Mercury vapor rectifier
BK – Ignitron
BM – Magnetron
BR – Forced air cooled triode
BS – TR (Transmit/receive) cell, TB cell, Solid-state microwave device
BT – Mercury vapor or xenon filled thyratron
BW – Water cooled triode
BY – Vapor cooled triode
C – Radiation-cooled tetrode
CR – Forced air cooled tetrode
CW – Water cooled tetrode
CX – Hydrogen tetrode thyratron
E – Storage tube
FX – Hydrogen triode thyratron
GX – Spark gap
K – Klystron
M – Magnetron
NFT – Nernst filament, a source of mid-infrared radiation
P – Video camera tube
QS – Voltage-regulator tube
QT – Cold-cathode trigger tube
T – CRT
U – Vacuum capacitor
XL – Glow modulator tube, flash tube, gas laser

Examples:
B142 – 400 W RF power triode up to 50 MHz similar to 833A
B1109 = 3C24 – 25 W VHF power triode up to 60 MHz
B1135 = 5867 = CV1350 – VHF power triode up to 100 MHz
B1152 – 500W RF power triode up to 50 MHz
QT1257 – Touch button tube, an illuminated capacitance touch switch; a cold-cathode DC relay tube, external (capacitive) starter activated by touching; then the cathode glow is visible. 6-pin octal base
XL601, XL602, XL603, XL627, XL628, XL631 and XL632 – Cold-cathode, linear light source (glow modulator tube), gas diode with a blue-violet glow, modulation up to 1 MHz, 2-pin Octal base, for rotating-drum FAX receivers, etc.

ETL computing tubes system
The British Ericsson Telephones Limited (ETL), of Beeston, Nottingham (not to be confused with the Swedish TelefonAB Ericsson), original holder of the now-generic trademark Dekatron, used the following system:

An initial letter denoting the filling:
G – Noble gas-filled
V – Vacuum
One letter denoting the type:
C – Common-cathode Counter Dekatron that makes only carry/borrow cathodes separately available for cascading
D – Diode, voltage reference, etc.
R – Register (Readout) – Digital indicator
S – Trochotron or Separate-cathode Counter/Selector Dekatron that makes all cathodes available on individual pins for displaying, divide-by-n counter/timer/prescalers, etc.
TE – Trigger tetrode, one starter electrode and a keep-alive (primer) electrode for ion availability
TR – Trigger triode, one starter electrode only
A digit group:
Dekatrons: Stage count
Digital indicators: Display cathode count
Diodes, voltage references: Nominal voltage
Trigger tubes: Ignition voltage
An optional digit group after a slash: Pin count
One letter denoting the type:
A – Plastic base
B – Plastic base
C – Plastic base
D – Plastic base
E – Plastic base
G – 26-pin B26A base
H – 27-pin B27A base
M – B7G base
P – B7G base
Q – B7G base
W – Wire-ends
X – Wire-ends
Y – Wire-ends

Examples:

GC10/2P – Neon-filled, 1 kHz Miniature decade Counter Dekatron, a gas-filled, bidirecional decade counter tube
GC10A – Helium-filled, decade Counter Dekatron
GC10B – Neon-filled, 4 kHz Long life, decade Counter Dekatron
GC10/4B – 4 kHz Decade Computing Counter Dekatron with carry/borrow cathodes "0" and "9" and intermediate cathodes "3" and "5" wired to separate pins
GC10D – 20 kHz Decade Counter Dekatron, for single-pulse operation
GC12/4B – 4 kHz Duodecimal Counter Dekatron with carry/borrow cathodes 11 and 12 and intermediate cathodes 6 and 8 wired to separate pins
GCA10G – 10 kHz max. Decade Counter Dekatron with routing guides and aux anodes to directly drive Nixie tubes, B27A base without the inner pin ring
GD2V – 2 kV, 16 J discharge tube, all-glass studded
GD75P – 75 V Voltage reference, miniature 7-pin base
GD90M – 90 V Voltage reference, miniature 7-pin base
GD340X – 345 V/3...200 μA Corona voltage reference, all-glass wire-ended
GD350X, GD350Y – 350 V/3...200 μA Corona voltage reference, all-glass wire-ended
GD550W – 550 V, 1.5 J Discharge tube, e.g. for power relaxation oscillators, all-glass wire-ended
GDT120M – 9 mA Gas-filled cold-cathode DC triode, one starter and a separate glow diode acting as an optical primer, miniature 7-pin base
GR2G –  + -  Neon-filled digital indicator tube, 18 x 18 mm characters, side-viewing
GR2H –  + -  Neon-filled digital indicator tube, 20 x 20 mm characters, top-viewing
GR4G –     1  Neon-filled digital indicator tube, 18 x 30 mm characters, side-viewing
GR7M –  + - V A Ω % ~  Neon-filled digital indicator tube, 15.5 mm character height, top-viewing
GR10A – Gas-filled digital indicator tube with a dekatron-type readout
GR10G –  0 1 2 3 4 5 6 7 8 9  Neon-filled digital indicator tube, 16.86 x 30 mm characters, side-viewing
GR10H –  0 1 2 3 4 5 6 7 8 9  Neon-filled digital indicator tube, 12 x 19 mm characters, top-viewing
GR10J –  0 1 2 3 4 5 6 7 8 9  Neon-filled digital indicator tube, 16.86 x 30 mm characters, side-viewing
GR10K –  0 1 2 3 4 5 6 7 8 9  Neon-filled digital indicator tube, 12 x 19 mm characters, top-viewing
GR10M –  0 1 2 3 4 5 6 7 8 9  Neon-filled digital indicator tube, 10 x 15.5 mm characters, top-viewing
GR10W –  0 1 2 3 4 5 6 7 8 9  Neon-filled digital indicator tube, 8.42 x 15 mm characters, side-viewing, all-glass wire-ended
GR12G –  A B C D E F G H I J K L  Neon-filled digital indicator tube, 16 x 30 mm characters, side-viewing
GR12H –  E L M N P R S T U V W X  Neon-filled digital indicator tube, 16 x 30 mm characters, side-viewing
Note: More Nixie tubes under standard - ZM and professional - ZM
GS10C – 4 kHz max. Decade Counter/Selector Dekatron, top-viewing, duodecal base
GS10D – Hydrogen-filled, 20 kHz max. Decade Counter/Selector Dekatron, duodecal base
GS10H – 4 kHz max. Decade Counter/Selector Dekatron with routing guides, B17A base
GS12C – 4 kHz max. Duodecimal Counter/Selector Dekatron, with solder lugs
GS12D – Neon-filled, 4 kHz max. duodecimal Counter/Selector Dekatron, duodecal base with two additional wire-ends for the guide electrodes
GSA10G – 10 kHz max. Decade Counter/Selector Dekatron with routing guides and aux anodes to directly drive Nixie tubes, B27A base
GTE120Y – 5 mA Subminiature DC trigger tetrode, one starter and one primer, all-glass wire-ended
GTE130T – 8 mApeak DC trigger tetrode, one starter and one primer, close tolerance, low aging, quadrant I operation only, noval base
GTE175M – 3.5 mAavg, 50 mApeak DC Trigger tetrode, one starter and one primer, miniature 7-pin base, for Dekatron coupling circuits
GTR120W – 9 mA Subminiature DC trigger triode, 3-pin all-glass wire-ended, for computer applications
GTR75M – 75 V Voltage reference, Miniature 7-pin
GTR95M/S – 95 V Voltage reference, Miniature 7-pin
GTR150 – Subminiature, primed 150 V voltage reference, all-glass wire-ended
VS10G – Trochotron, an electron-beam decade counter tube
VS10G-M – VS10G with a magnetic shield
VS10H – High-current trochotron
VS10K – Low-voltage trochotron

Marconi-Osram system
The British GEC–Marconi–Osram designation from the 1920s uses one or two letter(s) followed by two numerals and sometimes by a second letter identifying different versions of a particular type.

The letter(s) generally denote the type or use:
Note: A preceding letter M indicates a 4-volts AC indirectly heated tube

A – General professional tube
B – Dual triode
D – Detector diode

GT – Gas-filled triode
GU – Gas-filled rectifier
H – High-impedance signal triode
KT – Kinkless Tetrode - beam power tube
L – Low-impedance signal triode
N – Power pentode
P – Power triode up to 3 W
PT – Power pentode
PX – 3...25 W Power triode
QP – Dual pentode
S – Tetrode

U – Rectifier
VS – Remote-cutoff tetrode
W – Remote-cutoff pentode
X – Triode/hexode frequency-changer
Y – Optical tuning/level indicator
Z – Sharp-cutoff RF pentode

The following numbers are sequentially assigned for each new device.

Examples:
A1834 = 6AS7G/ECC230 = CV2523 – Dual power triode (series regulator), octal base.
B309 = 12AT7/ECC81 – High-mu dual triode. Commonly used as R.F. amplifier/mixer in VHF circuits.
B719 = 6AQ8/ECC85 – Dual RF triode, RF Amp & Mixer in FM receivers, noval base.
D41 = V914 – Indirectly heated, Dual Detector Diode, British 5-pin base.
D42 – Indirectly heated, Single Detector Diode, British 4-pin base.
GU21 = AH221 = RG4-1250 – Half-wave mercury-vapor rectifier, Edison screw lamp base.
H63 = 6F5 – High-mu triode, octal base.
H610 – Directly heated, high-mu AF triode, British 4-pin base.
KT32 (25L6, 25L6G, 25L6GT and 25W6GT)
KT33 (25A6GT)
KT41
KT61 (6M6G) in parallel filament circuits
KT63 (6F6, 6F6G, 6F6GT)
KT66 (6L6GC)
KT67 – Small transmitting valve
KT71 (50L6GT)
KT77 – Similar to EL34, 6CA7
KT81
KT88 = 6550A = CV5220 (12E13, 7D11) – AF beam power tube, two tubes are capable of providing 100W output, Class-AB1, octal base
L63 = 6J5 – Low-mu triode, octal base.
L610 – Directly heated, Low-mu RF triode, British 4-pin base.
MT7A, MT7B – Large radiation-cooled transmitting triodes used in the 1920s and 1930s.
MU14 = UU5 = IW4-500 – Indirectly heated full-wave rectifier, British 4-pin base.
N77 = 6AM5/EL91 – Power pentode, 7-pin miniature base.
P425 = PM254 – Power triode with a 4 V/200 mA battery heater and a British 4-pin base
P610 – Directly heated, AF power triode, British 4-pin base.
P625 – AF power triode.
PX4 – AF power triode designed in the 1930s. Capable of providing about 4.5 W of audio.
QP21 – Directly heated, dual AF (push-pull) power pentode, British 7-pin base.
QP240 – Directly heated, dual AF (push-pull) power pentode, British 9-pin base.
S610 – Directly heated, Sharp-cutoff RF tetrode, British 4-pin base.
U52 = 5U4G = 5AS4A/5U4GB – Full-wave rectifier, octal base.
VS24 – Directly heated, Remote-cutoff RF tetrode, British 4-pin base.
W727 = 6BA6/EF93 = 5749 – Remote-cutoff RF pentode, 7-pin miniature base.
X41 – Triode/hexode mixer designed to be a direct plug-in replacement for the MX40 pentagrid converter.
X61, X61M = 6J8G – British triode/heptode mixer, octal based.
X63 = 6A8 – Heptode pentagrid converter, octal based.
X727 = 6BE6/EK90 =  5750  – Pentagrid converter, 7-pin miniature base.
Y61, Y63 = 6U5G = VI103 – Optical tuning/level indicator, octal base, similar to 6G5.
Z77 = 6AM6/EF91 – Sharp-cutoff RF pentode, 7-pin miniature base.

Mullard designations before 1934
Older Mullard tubes were mostly designated PM, followed by a number containing the filament voltage.

Many later tubes were designated one to three semi-intuitive letters, followed by a number containing the heater voltage. This was phased out after 1934 when Mullard adopted the Mullard–Philips scheme.

Examples:
2D4 – Dual Diode with a 4 V/650 mA heater and a British 5-pin base
AP4 = 4676 – Acorn UHF pentode up to 430 MHz, 4 Volts heater
AT4 = 4675 – Acorn UHF triode up to 430 MHz, 4 Volts heater
FC4 = MX40 – Octode Frequency Converter with a 4 V/650 mA heater and a British 7-pin base
Pen20 – Power Pentode with a 20 V/180 mA heater and a British 5- or 7-pin base
PM254 = P425 – "Super Power" triode with a 4 V/200 mA battery heater and a British 4-pin base
TDD4 = MHD4 = AC/HLDD – Triode, dual Diode with a 4 V/550 mA heater and a British 7-pin base
TH21C – Triode/Hexode frequency converter with a 21 V/200 mA series heater and a British 7-pin base
TP4 = AC/TP – Triode, Pentode with a 4 V/1.25 A heater and a British 7-pin base
VP2 = VP21 = VP215 – Variable-mu Pentode with a 2 V/180 mA heater and a British 7-pin base

Philips system before 1934

The system consisted of one letter followed by 3 or 4 digits. It was phased out after 1934 when Philips adopted the Mullard–Philips scheme.

1st letter: Heater current
A – 60...90 mA
B – 100...190 mA (This designation lived on as the "B" (180 mA) in the Mullard–Philips system)
C – 200...390 mA (This designation lived on as the "C" (200 mA) in the Mullard–Philips system)
D – 400...690 mA
E – 700...990 mA
F – 1...2 A

1 or 2 digit(s): Heater voltage

Last 2 digits: Type
00–40, 99: Triode amplification factor
41–98:
second-last digit: sequentially assigned, starting at 4
last digit:
1 – Tetrode with a space charge grid (the 2nd grid is the control grid)
2 – Tetrode with a screen grid (the 1st grid is the control grid)
3 – Power pentode
4 – Binode, a diode/triode or diode/tetrode
5 – Remote-cutoff RF tetrode
6 – Signal pentode
7 – Remote-cutoff RF pentode
8 – Sharp-cutoff hexode frequency changer
9 – Remote-cutoff hexode

Examples:
A106 – Directly heated triode, 1 V, 60 mA filament, amplification factor = 6
A425 = RE034 = HR406 – RF triode, 4 V, 60 mA filament
A435 – Directly heated triode, 4 V, 60 mA filament, amplification factor = 35
A441 – Directly heated tetrode with a space charge grid, 4 V, 60 mA filament
A442 = RES094 = S406 – Directly heated tetrode with a screen grid, 4 V, 60 mA filament
B409 = RE134 = L414 – Triode, 4 Volt, 140 mA filament
B2038 = REN1821 = R2018 = A2118 – Triode, 180 mA heater
B2043 = RENS1823D = PP2018D = L2318D – Indirectly heated power pentode, 20 V, 180 mA DC series heater
B2044 = RENS1854 = DS2218 – Indirectly heated diode/tetrode, 20 V, 180 mA DC series heater
B2044S = REN1826 – Indirectly heated diode/triode, 20 V, 180 mA DC series heater
B2045 = RENS1819 – Indirectly heated remote-cutoff RF tetrode, 20 V, 180 mA DC series heater
B2048 = RENS1824 = MH2018 – Hexode mixer, 20 V, 180 mA heater
B2099 = REN1814 – Indirectly heated triode, 20 V, 180 mA DC series heater, amplification factor = 99
E443H = RES964 = PP4101 = L496D – Power pentode, 4 V heater
E446 = RENS1284 = HP4101 – Indirectly heated RF pentode, 4 V, 1.1 A heater
E447 = RENS1294 = HP4106 – Indirectly heated remote-cutoff RF pentode, 4 V, 1.1 A heater
E448 = RENS1224 = MH4100 – Indirectly heated sharp-cutoff hexode frequency changer, 4 V, 1.2 A heater
E449 = RENS1234 = FH4105 – Indirectly heated remote-cutoff hexode, 4 V, 1.2 A heater
F215 – Indirectly heated triode, 2.5 V, 1.5 A heater, amplification factor = 15

STC/Brimar receiving tubes system
First number: Type
1 – Half-wave rectifier
2 – Diode
3 – Power triode
4 – High-mu triode
5 – Sharp-cutoff tetrode
6 – Vari-mu tetrode
7 – Power or video pentode
8 – Sharp-cutoff RF pentode
9 – Vari-mu RF pentode
10 – Dual diode
11 – Triode and dual diode
12 – AF Pentode and dual diode
13 – Dual high-mu triode
14 – Dual Class-B power triode
15 – Heptode
16 – DC-coupled power triode
17 – RF pentode and dual diode
18 – Pentode and triode
20 – Hexode/heptode and triode

Next letter: Heater rating
A – 3.6 to 4.4 V Indirectly heated
B – 2 V Directly heated
C – Directly heated other than 2 or 4 V
D – All other heater ratings, indirectly heated other than 4 V

Number: Sequentially assigned number

Examples:
1D6 – Indirectly heated, half-wave rectifier, British 5-pin base
4D1 – Indirectly heated triode, British 7-pin base
7A3 – Indirectly heated power pentode, British 7-pin base
8A1 – Indirectly heated RF sharp-cutoff pentode, British 5-pin base with anode top cap
9A1 – Indirectly heated RF/IF remote-cutoff pentode, British 5-pin base with anode top cap
10D1 – Indirectly heated, common-cathode dual diode, British 5-pin base
11A2 – Indirectly heated, common-cathode dual diode and triode, British 7-pin base
13D3 – Indirectly heated, common-cathode dual triode, Noval base
15A2 – Indirectly heated, heptode pentagrid converter, British 7-pin base
20D4 – Indirectly heated, triode/heptode frequency mixer, Noval base

Valvo system before 1934
Valvo(de, it) was a major German electronic components manufacturer from 1924 to 1989; a Philips subsidiary since 1927, Valvo was one of the predecessors of NXP Semiconductors.

The system consisted of one or two letters followed by 3 or 4 digits. It was phased out after 1934 when Valvo adopted the Mullard–Philips scheme.

First letter(s): Type
A – Triode
AN – Binode, a diode/triode or diode/tetrode
G – Rectifier
H – RF tube
L – Power tube
LK – Power amplifier
U – Triode with a space charge grid
W – Triode for resistor-coupled amplifiers
X – Hexode
Number:
If the first digit is 4, the tube has a 4 V heater
Otherwise, the last two digits give the heater current in tens of mA.
A following letter D indicates more than one grid, not counting a space charge grid

Examples:
A2118 = B2038 = REN1821 = R2018 – Triode, 180 mA (=18×10 mA) heater
H2018D = B2042 = RENS1820 = S2018 – RF Tetrode, 180 mA heater
L496D = E443H = RES964 = PP4101 – Power pentode, 4 V heater
L2318D = B2043 = RENS1823D = PP2018D – Power pentode, 180 mA heater

East European systems

Lamina transmitting tubes system

Polish Lamina(pl) transmitting tube designations consist of one or two letters, a group of digits and an optional letter and/or two digits preceded by a "/" sign.

The first letter indicates the tube type, two equal letters denoting a dual tube:
P – Pentode
Q – Tetrode
T – Triode

A group of digits represents the maximum anode power dissipation in kW

An optional letter specifies the cooling method:
<none> – Radiation
P – Forced air
W – Water

The first of the two digits after the "/" sign means:
1 – Tube for radio broadcasting and radiocommunication equipment
2 – Tube for industrial equipment
3 – Tube used in TV broadcasting equipment
4 – Tube for radiocommunication equipment with unbalanced modulation
5 – Modulator or pulse tube

The second digit after the "/" is sequentially assigned.

Examples:
Q01 – Power tetrode up to 125 MHz, 0.1 kW (=100 W)
Q3.5 – Power tetrode up to 220 MHz, 3.5 kW
QQ-004/11 – Dual beam power tetrode up to 500 MHz, 0.04 kW (=40 W)
T01 – Power triode up to 200 MHz, 135 W
T015/21 – Power triode up to 150 MHz, 150 W
T02 – Power triode up to 60 MHz, 200 W
T05P/31 – Forced air cooled power triode up to 1 GHz, 1 kW
T2/22 – Power triode up to 60 MHz, 3 kW
T6 – Power triode up to 30 MHz, 6 kW
T8P/21 – Forced air cooled power triode up to 120 MHz, 8 kW
T10P/22 – Power triode up to 30 MHz, 10 kW
T-25P – Forced air cooled power triode up to 30 MHz, 25 kW
T60W/21 – Water cooled power triode up to 30 MHz, 6 kW

RFT transmitting tubes system

Rundfunk- und Fernmelde-Technik(de, sv) was the brand of a group of telecommunications manufacturers in the German Democratic Republic. The designation consists of a group of three letters and a group of three or four digits.

The first two letters determine the tube type:
GR – Rectifier tube
SR – Transmitter tube
VR – Amplifier tube

The third letter specifies the cooling method:
L – Forced air
S – Radiation
V – Vapor (the anode is immersed in evaporating water, and the steam is collected, condensed and recycled)
W – Water

The first digit (or the first two digits in double tubes) indicates the number of electrodes:
2 – Diode
3 – Triode
4 – Tetrode
5 – Pentode

The last two digits are sequentially assigned.

Examples:
SRS301 – Radiation-cooled triode up to 40 MHz, 900 W
SRS464 – Radiation-cooled, vibration-resistant pulse tetrode up to 300 kW
SRS4451 – Radiation-cooled dual tetrode up to 500 MHz, 60 W
SRS4452 = QQE03/20 = 6252 – Radiation-cooled dual tetrode up to 600 MHz, 20 W
SRS4452 – Radiation-cooled dual tetrode up to 600 MHz, 20 W
SRS501 – Radiation-cooled pentode up to 50 MHz, 100 W
SRS552N = ГУ-50 – Radiation-cooled pentode up to 120 MHz, 50 W
VRS303 – Radiation-cooled AF triode, 1 kW
VRS328 – Radiation-cooled AF triode, 150 W
VRS331 – Radiation-cooled AF triode, 450 W

Note: RFT used the Mullard–Philips and RETMA schemes for their low-power tubes.

Tesla systems (Czechoslovakia)

Signal tubes
Besides the genuine Mullard–Philips system, Tesla also used an M-P/RETMA hybrid scheme:

First number: Heater voltage, as in the RETMA system

Next letter(s): Type, subset of the Mullard–Philips system

Next digit: Base
1 – Octal K8A
2 – Loctal B8G
3 – Miniature 7-pin B7G
4 – Noval B9A
5 – Special, mostly 9 out of 10 1.25mm pins on a 25mm-diameter circle
6 – Submagnal B11A
7 – Duodecal B12A
8 – Diheptal B14A
9 – Wire-ends

Last digit: Sequentially assigned number

Examples:
1M90 (DM70/1M3) – Subminiature indicator tube, 1.4V/25 mA filament, all-glass wire-ended
1Y32 – Miniature 7-pin High-voltage directly heated rectifier with 1.4 V/265 mA WTh filament. Type 1Y32T has oxide cathode. 
4L20 – Directly heated RF power pentode; center-tapped 4.2 V/325 mA filament; Soviet 4P1L (4П1Л), German RL4,2P6 with Loctal base
6B31 – Dual diode up to 700 MHz; 6.3V/300mA heater, miniature 7-pin base
6BC32 (6AV6, EBC91) – Dual diode and triode; 6.3V/300mA heater, miniature 7-pin base
6CC31 (6J6, ECC91) – 600 MHz dual triode; 6.3V/450mA heater, miniature 7-pin base
6CC42 (2C51) – VHF dual triode; 6.3V/350mA heater, noval base
6F24 – Telecom pentode, 6.3V/450mA heater, Loctal base
6F36 (6AH6) – Sharp-cutoff IF/video pentode, 6.3V/450mA heater, miniature 7-pin base
6H31 (6BE6, EK90) – Heptode mixer; 6.3V/300mA heater, miniature 7-pin base
6L36 (6AQ5, EL90) – Power pentode, 6.3V/450mA heater, miniature 7-pin base
6L41 (5763) – Beam tetrode, 6.3V/750mA heater, noval base
35Y31 – Half-wave rectifier, 35V/150mA series heater; UY1N with miniature 7-pin base

Power tubes
First letter:
R – Rectifier or RF tube
U – Gas-filled power rectifier
Z – Modulator tube

Next letter(s): Type, subset of the Mullard–Philips scheme

Next number: Anode dissipation in W (if radiation cooled) or kW (otherwise)

The next letter specifies the cooling method:
<none> – Radiation
V – Vapor
X – Forced air
Y – Water

Examples:
RA0007B – Directly heated saturated-emission ballast diode. Acts as a heating current-controlled, variable series resistor in voltage/current stabilizer circuits; UAmax 600 V IAmax 700 μA, noval base
RA100A – 40 kV, 100 mA Half-wave rectifier with an E40 Goliath Edison screw lamp base and an anode top cap
RC5B – Bowl-type UHF power triode up to 5 W
RD27AS – Radiation-cooled power triode up to 25 MHz, 27 W
RD200B – Radiation-cooled power triode up to 60 MHz, 200 W
RD300S – Radiation-cooled power triode up to 200 MHz, 300 W
RD150YA – Water-cooled power triode up to 3 MHz, 150 kW
RE40AK = KT88
RE65A – Radiation-cooled beam tetrode up to 260 MHz, 65 W
RE125C – Radiation-cooled beam tetrode up to 235 MHz, 125 W
RE400C – Radiation-cooled beam tetrode up to 235 MHz, 400 W
RE20XL – Air-cooled beam tetrode up to 220 MHz, 20 kW
REE30A – Radiation-cooled dual beam tetrode up to 250 MHz, 20 W
RL15A – Radiation-cooled power pentode up to 60 MHz, 20 W
RL40A – Radiation-cooled power pentode up to 120 MHz, 40 W
RL65A – Radiation-cooled power pentode up to 15 MHz, 65 W
UA025A – 10 kV, 250 mA Argon-filled, half-wave rectifier with an E27 Edison screw lamp base and an anode screw top cap
UA5A – 11 kV, 5 A Half-wave mercury-vapor rectifier with a 2-pin base and an anode screw top cap
ZD1000F – Radiation-cooled power triode up to 60 MHz, 1 kW
ZD1XB – Air-cooled AF power triode up to 1.2 kW
ZD3XH – Air-cooled power triode up to 60 MHz, 3 kW
ZD8XA – Air-cooled power triode up to 20 MHz, 8 kW
ZD12YA – Air-cooled AF power triode up to 20 MHz, 12 kW
ZE025XS – Air-cooled beam tetrode up to 400 MHz, 250 W

Tungsram receiving tubes system before 1934

The Tungsram system was composed of a maximum of three letters and three or four digits. It was phased out after 1934 when Tungsram adopted the Mullard–Philips scheme, frequently preceding it with the letter T, as in TAD1 for AD1.

Letter: System type:
Note: A preceding letter A indicates an indirectly heated tube
D – Detector diode
DD – Dual diode
DG – Tetrode with a space charge grid (the 2nd grid is the control grid)
DS – Diode-tetrode
FH – Remote-cutoff hexode pentagrid converter
G – Preamplifier triode
H – Voltage amplifier triode or grid-leak detector
HP – RF pentode
HR – RF triode
L – AF power triode
MH – Hexode pentagrid converter
MO – Octode pentagrid converter
O – Transmitting tube
P – Power triode
PP – Power pentode
PV – Full-wave rectifier
R – High-Mu triode
S – Tetrode
V – Half-wave rectifier
X – US-licensed tube

Number:
First digit (or the first two digits): Heater voltage
Remaining digits: Heater current in tens of mA, but the last digit is sequentially assigned

Examples:
AS4100 – Tetrode, 4 V, 1 A (=100×10 mA) indirect heater
FH4105 = E449 = RENS1234 – Indirectly heated remote-cutoff hexode, 4 V, 1.2 A heater
HP4101 = E446 = RENS1284 – RF pentode, 4 V, 1 A filament
HP4106 = E447 = RENS1294 – Indirectly heated remote-cutoff RF pentode, 4 V, 1.1 A heater
HR406 = A425 = RE034 – RF triode, 4 V, 60 mA (=6×10 mA) filament
L414 = B409 = RE134 – Triode, 4 Volt, 140 mA (=14×10 mA) filament
MH2018 = B2048 = RENS1824 – Hexode mixer, 20 V, 180 mA (=18×10 mA) heater
MH4100 = E448 = RENS1224 – Indirectly heated sharp-cutoff hexode frequency changer, 4 V, 1.2 A heater
PP2018D = B2043 = RENS1823D = L2318D – Indirectly heated power pentode, 20 V, 180 mA DC series heater
PP4101 = E443H = RES964 = L496D – Power pentode, 4 V heater
PV4200 – Full-wave rectifier, 4 V, 2 A (=200×10 mA) filament
R2018 = B2038 = REN1821 = A2118 – Triode, 180 mA heater
S406 = A442 = RES094 – Directly heated tetrode with a screen grid, 4 V, 60 mA filament
S2018 = B2042 = RENS1820 = H2018D – RF Tetrode, 180 mA heater

Russian systems

Vacuum tubes produced in the former Soviet Union and in present-day Russia are designated in Cyrillic. Some confusion has been created in transliterating these designations to Latin.

The first system was introduced in 1929. It consisted of one or two letters (designating system type and, optionally, type of cathode), a dash, then a sequentially assigned number with up to 3 digits.

In 1937, the Soviet Union purchased a tube assembly line from RCA (who at the time had difficulties raising funds for their basic operations), including production licenses and initial staff training, and installed it on the Svetlana/Светлана plant in St. Petersburg, Russia. US-licensed tubes were produced since then under an adapted RETMA scheme.

Examples:
6Ф5 = 6F5 – High-mu triode
6Ф6 = 6F6 – Power pentode
6Х6 = 6H6 – Dual diode
6Ж7 = 6J7/EF37 – Sharp-cutoff pentode
6Л6 = 6L6 – Beam tetrode
6Л7 = 6L7 – Pentagrid converter
6Н7 = 6N7 – Dual power triode

GOST standard tubes system

In the 1950s a 5-element system ( "State standard" ГОСТ/GOST 5461–59, later 13393–76) was adopted in the (then) Soviet Union for designating receiver vacuum tubes.

The first element is a number specifying filament voltage. The second element is a Cyrillic letter specifying the type of device. The third element is a sequentially assigned number that distinguishes between different devices of the same type. 
The fourth element denotes the type of envelope. An optional fifth element consists of a dash followed by one or more characters to designate special characteristics of the tube. This usually implies construction differences, not just selection from regular quality production.

Professional tubes system
There is another designation system for professional tubes such as transmitter ones.

The first element designates function. The next elements varies in interpretation. For ignitrons, rectifiers, and thyratrons, there is a digit, then a dash, then the anode current in amperes, a slash, anode voltage in kV. A letter may be attached to designate water cooling (no letter designates a radiation cooled device). For transmitting tubes in this system, the second element starts with a dash, a sequentially assigned number, then an optional letter specifying cooling method. For phototubes and photomultipliers, the second element is a sequential number and then a letter code identifying vacuum or gas fill and the type of cathode.

Japanese systems

Older numbering system 1930s–40s

A letter: Structure and usage
E – Electron ray tube
K – Kenotron (rectifier)
U – General-purpose tube

Then a letter: Base and outline
N – Wire-ended (Acorn tubes, etc.)
S – Octal
T – ST large 7-pin
t – ST small 7-pin
V – 4-pin
X – S/ST 4-pin
x – Peanut 4-pin
Y – S/ST 5-pin
y – Peanut 5-pin
Z – S/ST 6-pin U6A

Then a dash, followed by a sequentially assigned number or the designation of the American original

Then an optional dash, followed by a letter: Version

Examples:
EZ-6G5 = 6G5 – Variable-mu "Magic Eye"-type tuning indicator
KX-80-B – Kenotron
UN-954 = 954 – Acorn sharp-cutoff pentode
UN-955 = 955 – Acorn triode
US-6A8 = 6A8 – Pentagrid converter
US-6L7G = 6L7G – Pentagrid converter
UX-26-B – Medium-mu RF triode
UX-167 – Sharp-cutoff RF pentode
UY-47B – Pentode
UZ-58-A – Remote-cutoff RF/IF pentode

JIS C 7001 system
JIS C 7001 was published in 1951 and modified in 1965 and 1970

A number: Heater voltage range, as in the RETMA scheme
1 – 1 V ≤ Uf < 2 V
2 – 2 V ≤ Uf < 2.5 V
3 – 2.5 V ≤ Uf < 4 V
4 – 4 V ≤ Uf < 5 V
5 – 5 V ≤ Uf < 6 V
6 – 6 V ≤ Uf < 7 V
etc.

Then a letter: Base and Outline
A – Special base
B – Other
C – Compactron (Duodecar)
D – Subminiature button base
E – Subminiature flat base
F – European 4-pin ST
G – Octal base glass tube (GT)
H – Magnoval
K – Ceramic
L – Loctal
M – Miniature 7-pin
N – Nuvistor
Q – Acorn tube
R – Noval or Neonoval
S – Octal
T – Large 7-pin ST
W – 7-pin ST
X – 4-pin ST
Y – 5-pin ST
Z – 6-pin ST

Then a dash, followed by a letter: Structure and usage
A – Power triode
B – Beam power tube
C – Pentagrid converter
D – Diode
E – Optical tuning/level indicator
G – Gas-filled rectifier
H – High-mu triode (μ>30)
K – Kenotron (rectifier)
Even number after K: Full-wave rectifier
Odd number after K: Half-wave rectifier
L – Low-mu triode (μ<30)
P – Power tetrode or pentode
R – Sharp-cutoff tetrode or pentode
S – Tetrode with a space charge grid (the 2nd grid is the control grid)
T – Gas-filled, grid-controlled
V – Variable-mu (remote-cutoff) tetrode and pentode
X – Other

Then a sequentially assigned number

Then an optional letter: Version

Examples:
2N-H12 – Nuvistor
2X-L2A – Low-mu triode
6C-A10 – Power triode
6G-A4 – Power triode
6G-B8 – Beam power tube
6G-E12A – 2-channel "Magic Eye"-type tuning indicator, rectangular target
6H-B26 – Beam power tube
6M-DE1 – Diode and "Magic Eye"-type tuning indicator, miniature 7-pin base
6M-E4 – "Magic Finger"-type tuning indicator, miniature 7-pin base
6M-E5 = 6ME5 – "Magic Eye"-type tuning indicator, miniature 7-pin base
6M-E10 – "Magic Eye"-type tuning indicator, miniature 7-pin base
6N-H10 – Nuvistor
6R-A8 – Power triode
6R-B10 – Beam power tube
6R-B11 – Beam power tube

Military naming systems

British CV and M8000s naming systems

This system prefixes a three- or four-digit number with the letters "CV", meaning "civilian valve" i.e. common to all three armed services. It was introduced during the Second World War to rationalise the previous nomenclatures maintained separately by the War Office/Ministry of Supply, Admiralty and Air Ministry/Ministry of Aircraft Production on behalf of the three armed services (e.g. "ACR~", "AR~", "AT~", etc. for CRTs, receiving and transmitting valves used in army equipments, "NC~", "NR~" and "NT~" similarly for navy equipments and "VCR~", "VR~" and "VT~" etc. for air force equipments), in which three separate designations could in principle apply to the same valve (which often had at least one prototype commercial designation as well). These numbers generally have identical equivalents in both the North American, RETMA, and West European, Mullard–Philips, systems but they bear no resemblance to the assigned "CV" number.

Examples:
CV1988 = 6SN7GT = ECC32 (not a direct equivalent as heater current is different and bulb is larger)
CV2729 = E80F – An SQ version of EF80 but with revised pin-out and a base screen substituted for the RF screen
The "4000" numbers identify special-quality valves though SQ valves CV numbered before that rule came in retain their original CV number:
CV4007 = E91AA – SQ version of 6AL5
CV4010 = E95F – SQ version of 6AK5 or EF95
CV4014 = M8083
The "M" in the part number denotes that it was developed by the military:
M8083 – Sharp-cutoff pentode, miniature 7-pin base (SQ version of EF91 = 6AM6 = Z77)
M8162 = 6060 – High-mu dual triode, for use as RF amplifier/mixer in VHF circuits, Noval base (SQ versions of ECC81 = 12AT7 = B309)

The principle behind the CV numbering scheme was also adopted by the US Joint Army-Navy JAN numbering scheme which was later considerably expanded into the US Federal and then NATO Stock Number system used by all NATO countries. This part-identification system ensures that every particular spare part (not merely thermionic valves) receives a unique stock number across the whole of NATO irrespective of the source, and hence is not held inefficiently as separate stores. In the case of CV valves, the stock number is always of the format 5960-99-000-XXXX where XXXX is the CV number (with a leading 0 if the CV number only has 3 digits).

U.S. naming systems

One system prefixes a three-digit number with the letters "VT", presumably meaning "Vacuum Tube". Other systems prefix the number with the letters "JHS" or "JAN". The numbers following these prefixes can be "special" four-digit numbers, or domestic two- or three-digit numbers or simply the domestic North American "RETMA" numbering system. Like the British military system, these have many direct equivalents in the civilian types.
Confusingly, the British also had two entirely different "VT" nomenclatures, one used by the Royal Air Force (see the preceding section) and the other used by the General Post Office, responsible for post and telecommunications at the time, where it may have stood for "valve, telephone"; none of these schemes corresponded in any way with each other.

Examples:
"VT" numbering systems
North American VT90 = 6H6
British (RAF) VT90 – VHF Transmitting triode
British (GPO) VT90 = ML4 = CV1732 – Power triode
VT104 – RF pentode
VT105 – RF triode

Other numeral-only systems

Various numeral-only systems exist. These tend to be used for devices used in commercial or industrial equipment. The oldest numbering systems date back to the early 1920s, such as a two-digit numbering system, starting with the UV-201A, which was considered as "type 01", and extended almost continuously up into the 1980s. Three- and four-digit numeral-only systems were maintained by R.C.A., but also adopted by many other manufacturers, and typically encompassed rectifiers and radio transmitter output devices. Devices in the low 800s tend to be transmitter output types, those in the higher 800s are not vacuum tubes, but gas-filled rectifiers and thyratrons, and those in the 900s tend to be special-purpose and high-frequency devices. Use was not rigorously systematic: the 807 had variants 1624, 1625, and 807W.

Other letter followed by numerals

There are quite a number of these systems from different geographical realms, such as those used on devices from contemporary Russian and Chinese production. Other compound numbering systems were used to mark higher-reliability types used in industrial or commercial applications. Computers and telecommunication equipment also required tubes of greater quality and reliability than for domestic and consumer equipment.

Some letter prefixes are manufacturer's codes:
C – RCA/Cunningham
CK, QK, RK – Raytheon Company
ECG – Philips/Sylvania
EM – Eitel McCullough
F – Federal Telephone and Radio
GE, GL – General Electric Corp. (not British General Electric Company)
HK – Heintz & Kaufman, Ltd. (San Francisco, California, USA)
HY – CBS/Hytron
ML – Machlett Laboratories, Inc.
NL – National Electronics, Inc.
NU – National Union Electric Corp.
PL – Philips N.V.
RCA – RCA/Radiotron
SV – Svetlana/Светлана
SY – Standard Telephones and Cables Ltd./Brimar
TH – Compagnie Française Thomson-Houston
WE – Western Electric Company
WL – Westinghouse Electric Corp.
XD – Central Electronic Manufacturers (Denville, New Jersey, USA)
For examples, see below

Some designations are derived from the behavior of devices considered to be exceptional.
Mazda/EdiSwan sold their first tubes for 4-volts AC mains transformer (as opposed to home storage battery) heating with the prefix AC/ (for examples see below).
The first beam tetrodes manufactured in the UK in the late 1930s by M-OV, carried a "KT" prefix meaning Kinkless Tetrode (for examples see above).

List of American RETMA tubes
Note: Typecode explained above. See also RETMA tube designation

"0 volt" gas-filled cold cathode tubes
First character is numeric zero, not letter O.

Voltage stabilisers and references
Function in a similar way to a Zener diode, at higher voltages. Letter order (A-B-C) indicates increasing voltage ratings on octal-based regulators and decreasing voltage ratings on miniature-based regulators.
0A2 – 150 volt regulator, 7-pin miniature base
0A3 – 75 volt regulator, octal base, aka VR75
0B2 – 105 volt regulator, 7-pin miniature base
0B3 – 90 volt regulator, octal base, aka VR90
0C2 – 75 volt regulator, 7-pin miniature base
0C3 – 105 volt regulator, octal base, aka VR105
0D3 – 150 volt regulator, octal base, aka VR150

Other cold-cathode tubes
0A4G – 25 mAavg, 100mApeak Gas triode designed for use as a ripple control receiver; with the cathode tied to the midpoint of a series-resonance LC circuit across live mains, it would activate a relay in its anode circuit while fres is present
0Y4 – 40 ≤ I ≤ 75 mA Half-wave gas rectifier with a starter anode, 5-pin octal base
0Z4 – 30 ≤ I ≤ 90 mA Argon-filled, full-wave gas rectifier, octal base. Widely used in vibrator power supplies in early automobile radio receivers.

1 volt heater/filament tubes

1.25 volt DC filament subminiature tubes
The following tubes were used in post-World War II walkie-talkies and pocket-sized portable radios. All have 1.25 volt DC filaments and directly heated cathodes. Some specify which end of the filament is to be powered by the positive side of the filament power supply (usually a battery).
1AC5 – Power pentode, FL
1AD4 – Sharp-cutoff pentode, FL
1AD5 – Sharp-cutoff pentode, R8
1AE5 – Heptode mixer, FL
1AG4 – Power pentode, FL
1AG5 – Diode, pentode, FL
1AH4 – RF pentode, FL
1AJ5 – Diode, sharp-cutoff pentode, FL
1AK4 – Sharp-cutoff pentode, FL
1AK5 – Diode, sharp-cutoff pentode, FL
1C8 – Pentagrid converter, R8
1D3 – Low-mu high-frequency triode, R8
1E8 – Pentagrid converter, R8
1Q6 – Diode, pentode, R8
1S6 – Diode, pentode, R8
1T6 – Diode, pentode, R8
1V5 – Power pentode, R8
1V6 – Triode-pentode converter, FL
1W5 – Sharp-cutoff pentode, R8

1.4 volt DC filament tubes
1A3 – High frequency diode with indirectly heated cathode. Used as a detector in some portable AM/FM receivers.
1A7GT/DK32 – Pentagrid converter, re-engineered version of types 1A6 and 1D7-G, designed for use in portable AC/DC/Dry-cell battery radios introduced in 1938. Has 1.4 V/50 mA filament.
1B7-GT – Re-engineered version of types 1C6 and 1C7-G, designed for use in dry-cell battery radios with shortwave bands. Has 1.4 V/100 mA filament
1G6-G – Dual power triode. "GT" version also available.
1L6 – Pentagrid frequency changer for battery radios with 50 mA filament
1LA6 (Loctal) and later 1L6 (7-pin miniature) – Battery pentagrid converter for Zenith Trans-Oceanic shortwave radio, 50 mA filament
1LB6 – Superheterodyne mixer for battery-operated radios
1LC6 – Similar to type 1LA6, but with higher conversion transconductance
1R5/DK91 – Pentagrid converter, anode voltage in the 45...90 volt range.
1S4 – Power output pentode Class-A amplifier, anode voltage in the 45...90 volt range.
1S5 – Sharp-cutoff pentode Class-A amplifier, and diode, used as detector and first A.F. stage in battery radio receivers. Anode voltage in the 67...90 volt range.
1T4/DF91 – Remote-cutoff R.F. Pentode Class-A amplifier, Miniature 7-pin base, used as R.F. and I.F. amplifier in battery radio receivers.
1U4 – Sharp-cutoff R.F. Pentode Class-A amplifier, Miniature 7-pin base, used as R.F. and I.F. amplifier in battery radio receivers, similar characteristics to 6BA6.
1U6 – Nearly identical to type 1L6, but with a 1.4 V/25 mA filament

"1" prefix for home receivers
These tubes were made for home storage battery receivers manufactured during the early to mid-1930s; all have 2.0 volt DC filaments despite the 1-prefix, intended to distinguish them from the 2.5 volt AC heated tubes listed below
1A4-p – Remote-cutoff pentode
1A4-t – Remote-cutoff tetrode
1A6 – Pentagrid converter up to only 10 MHz due to low heater power (2 V/60 mA) and consequent low emission in the oscillator section; also occasionally used as a grid-leak detector
1B4-p – Sharp-cutoff pentode
1B4-t – Sharp-cutoff tetrode
1B5 – Dual detector diode, medium-mu triode. Usually numbered 1B5/25S
1C5 – Power pentode (similar to 3Q5 except for filament)
1C6 – Pentagrid converter; 1A6, with double the heater power and double the frequency range
1C7-G – Octal version of type 1C6.
1D5-Gp – Octal version of type 1A4-p.
1D5-Gt – Octal version of type 1A4-t. (Note: This is a shouldered "G" octal, not a cylindrical "GT" octal.)
1D7-G – Octal version of type 1A6.
1E5-Gp – Octal version of type 1B4-p.
1E5-Gt – Octal version of type 1B4-t. (Note: This is a shouldered "G" octal, not a cylindrical "GT" octal.)
1E7-G – Dual power pentode for use as a driver when parallel-connected, or as a push-pull output. "GT" version also available
1F4 – Power pentode
1F5-G – Octal version of 1F4.
1F6 – Duplex diode, sharp-cutoff pentode
1F7-G – Octal version of type 1F6
1G5-G – Power pentode
1H4-G – Medium-mu triode, can be used as a power triode. Octal version of type 30, which is an upgraded version of type 01-A. "GT" version also available.
1H6-G – Octal version of type 1B5/25S. "GT" version also available.
1J5-G (950) – AF Power pentode
1J6-G – Dual power triode, octal version of type 19. "GT" version also available.

CRT anode rectifiers
1AD2 – Compactron High-voltage rectifier with 1.25 V/200 mA filament. Type 1AD2A has X-Radiation Shielding. 
1AJ2 – Compactron High-voltage rectifier with 1.25 V/200 mA filament
1AY2 – 2-pin "Duopin" base High-voltage rectifier. Has similar electrical characteristics as 1B3GT.
1B3GT – Octal High-voltage rectifier diode with 1.25 V filament common in monochrome TV receivers of the 1950s and early 1960s. Peak inverse voltage of 30 kV. Anode current 2 mA average, 17 mA peak. Derived from the earlier industrial type 8016. Many listed and labeled as 1B3GT/1G3GT. 
1BC2 – Noval High-voltage rectifier with 1.25 V/200 mA filament. Types 1BC2A and 1BC2B have X-Radiation Shielding.
1BG2 – Subminiature High-voltage rectifier with 1.4 V/575 mA filament. Has flexible leads.
1BQ2 – Noval High-voltage rectifier with 1.4 V/600 mA filament
1BY2 – Compactron High-voltage rectifier with 1.25 V/200 mA filament. Type 1BY2A has X-Radiation Shielding. 
1G3GT – Octal High-voltage rectifier. Same Characteristics as 1B3GT. Many listed and labeled as 1B3GT/1G3GT. 
1H2 – Noval High-voltage rectifier with 1.4 V/550 mA filament
1J3GT – Octal High-voltage rectifier. Same Characteristics as 1B3GT. Has filament-plate shorting protection. Many listed and labeled as 1J3GT/1K3GT.
1K3GT – Octal High-voltage rectifier. Same Characteristics as 1B3GT. Has filament-plate shorting protection. Many listed and labeled as 1J3GT/1K3GT.
1S2A – Noval High-voltage rectifier with 1.4 V/550 mA filament. Similar to DY86, DY87, DY802, 1R10, and 1R12. 
1T2 = R16 – Subminiature High-voltage rectifier with 1.4 V/140 mA filament. Has flexible leads.
1V2 – High-voltage rectifier with 0.625 V/300 mA filament, Miniature 7-pin base
1X2 – Noval High-voltage rectifier with 1.25 V/200 mA filament. 1X2A, 1X2B and 1X2C have X-Radiation Shielding. Similar to DY80 and R19.
1Y2 – 4 pin High-voltage rectifier with 1.5 V/290 mA filament. 50KV max PIV, 10mA peak, 2mA average. Usable up to 1 MHz.
1Z1 – Octal High-voltage rectifier with 0.7 V/180 mA filament.
1Z2 – Noval High-voltage rectifier with 1.25 V/265 mA filament.

2 volt heater/filament tubes

2.5 volt AC heater tubes
Tubes used in AC-powered radio receivers of the early 1930s
2A3 – Directly heated power triode, used for AF output stages in 1930s–1940s audio amplifiers and radios.
2A5 – Power Pentode (Except for heater, electronically identical to types 42 and 6F6)
2A6 – Dual diode, high-mu triode (Except for heater, electronically identical to type 75)
2A7 – Dual-tetrode-style pentagrid converter (Except for heater, electronically identical to types 6A7, 6A8 and 12A8)
2B7 – Dual diode and remote-cutoff pentode (Except for heater, electronically identical to type 6B7)
2E5 and 2G5 – Electron-ray indicators ("Eye tube") with integrated control triode. (Except for heater, electronically identical to types 6E5 and 6G5)

CRT anode rectifiers
2X2 – High Vacuum High Peak inverse voltage diode, used as rectifier in CRT EHT supplies. Similar to 1B3 and 1S2 except for heater voltage.

3 volt heater/filament tubes
3A3/3B2/3AW3 - High Voltage rectifier. An octal type used in color television sets. The heater power is 3.15 volts and 0.22 amps.
3CA3 - High Voltage rectifier. An octal type used in color television sets. The heater power is 3.6 volts and 0.225 amps. 
3CN3 - High Voltage rectifier. An octal type used in color television sets. The heater power is 3.15 volts and 0.48 amps. The large current is for the advantage of fast warm-up.
3CU3 - High Voltage rectifier. An octal type used in color television sets. The heater power is 3.15 volts and 0.28 amps. 
3CZ3 - High Voltage rectifier. An octal type used in color television sets. The heater power is 3.15 volts and 0.48 amps. The large current is for the advantage of fast warm-up.
3AT2 - High Voltage rectifier. A compactron used in television sets to supply power to the anode of the picture tube. It comes in the variation as the 3AT2B, mainly for color television sets with a large picture tube. The 3AT2B comes with X-radiation shielding on the inside. The heater power is 3.15 volts and 0.22 amps. 
3AW2 - High Voltage rectifier. A compactron used for color and black and white television sets. It comes in the variation as the 3AW2A as a replacement for the 3AW2 after the 1967 General Electric X-radiation scandal. The 3AW2A comes with X-radiation shielding on the inside. The heater power is 3.15 volts and 0.22 amps. 
3BF2 - High Voltage rectifier. A compactron used in television sets to supply power to the anode of the picture tube. This tube is very rare, and very special, because it implements an indirectly heated cathode, not connected to the filament. No data is found on this tube, except for the filament power (which is 3.6 volts, 0.225 amps) and the base (which is the 12GQ type). The only reason why we know it is a high voltage rectifier is that the base tells us so.
3BL2 - High Voltage rectifier. A compactron used in television sets to supply power to the anode of the picture tube. It comes in the variation as the 3BL2A as a replacement for the 3BL2 after the 1967 General Electric X-radiation scandal. The 3BL2A comes with X-radiation shielding on the inside. The heater power is 3.3 volts and 0.285 amps. 
3BM2 - High Voltage rectifier. A compactron used in television sets to supply power to the anode of the picture tube. It comes in the variation as the 3BM2A as a replacement for the 3BM2 after the 1967 General Electric X-radiation scandal. The 3BM2A comes with X-radiation shielding on the inside. The heater power is 3 volts and 0.3 amps. 
3BN2 - High Voltage rectifier. A compactron used for color television sets. It comes in the variation as the 3BN2A as a replacement for the 3BN2 after the 1967 General Electric X-radiation scandal. The 3BN2A comes with X-radiation shielding on the inside. The heater power is 3.15 volts and 0.22 amps.
3BS2 - High Voltage rectifier. A compactron used for color television sets. It comes in the variation as the 3BS2A and 3BS2B as a replacement for the 3BN2 after the 1967 General Electric X-radiation scandal. The 3BS2A and 3BS2B tubes are identical, maybe a small difference in ratings and characteristics. We do not know these differences as the 3BS2B tube data is not available. The 3BS2A and 3BS2B comes with X-radiation shielding on the inside. The heater power is 3.15 volts and 0.48 amps. The large current is for the advantage of fast warm-up. 
3BT2 - High Voltage rectifier. A compactron used for color television sets. It comes in the variation as the 3BT2A as a replacement for the 3BT2 after the 1967 General Electric X-radiation scandal. The 3BT2A comes with X-radiation shielding on the inside. The heater power is 3.15 volts and 0.48 amps. The large current is for the advantage of fast warm-up. 
3BW2 - High Voltage rectifier. A compactron used for color and black and white television sets. The 3BW2 comes with X-radiation shielding on the inside. It also comes with diffusion bonded cathode (a type of cathode that prevents the back-emission of the anode). This tube was designed in December 1970, after the 1967 General Electric X-radiation scandal. All high voltage rectifier tube types that were designed before 1967 had no X-radiation protection internally. That is why all these tubes made during and after 1967 have a suffix showing they had internal X-radiation protection. This is why there is no '3BW2A' type since it was made after 1967. The heater power is 3.15 volts and 0.22 amps.

5 volt heater/filament tubes
5AR4, GZ34 – Full wave rectifier
5AS4 – Full wave rectifier
5R4 – Full wave rectifier
5U4 – Full wave rectifier
5V4, GZ32 – Full wave rectifier
5Y3 – Full-wave rectifier, octal base version of type 80

6 volt heater tubes
6A6 – Dual Power Triode, used as a Class-A audio driver or a Class-B audio output. U7B base. 6.3 volt heater version of type 53 which had a 2.5 volt heater. Octal version – 6N7.
6A7 and 6A8 (PH4, X63) – Pentagrid converter – dual tetrode style. Based on type 2A7, which had a 2.5 volt heater. 6A7 has a UX7 base with top cap connection for control grid (grid 4). 6A8 is octal version with top cap connection for control grid. Loctal version: type 7B8.
6AB4/EC92 – High-mu triode (Pinout same as 6C4 except for pin 5 not having a connection)
6AB5/6N5 – "Magic Eye" cathode ray tuning indicator
6AC5-G – High-mu Power Triode
6AC7, 1852 – TV sharp-cutoff R.F. Pentode. (Often encountered in a black metal envelope, not to be confused with the 6CA7.)
6AC10 – Compactron High-mu triple triode for use as NTSC chroma signal demodulator matrix in analog color TV receivers, 12-pin base
6AD6-G and 6AF6-G – "Magic Eye" tuning indicators. Both have two "pie wedge" shadow indicators, one each on opposite sides of a single circular indicator target. Both shadows may be used in tandem or may be driven by two different signal sources. Type 6AE6-G is specifically made to drive each indicator with different signals. May also be driven by separate pentodes with different characteristics. E.g., a sharp-cutoff pentode like a 6J7 – which would be hyper-sensitive to any signal change – would drive one shadow, while a remote-cutoff pentode like a 6K7 – which would only react to stronger signals – would drive the other shadow. Both tubes have octal bases. Type 6AD6-G, with a target voltage rated from 100 to 150 volt, is designed for AC/DC radios. Type 6AF6-G, with a target voltage rated at 250 volt, is designed for larger AC radios.
6AE6-G – A driver triode specially designed for "Magic Eye" tuning indicator types 6AD6-G and 6AF6-G. Has a common heater and indirectly heated cathode, two internally connected triode grids – one with sharp-cutoff characteristics, one with remote-cutoff characteristics – and two anodes, one for each grid. The sharp-cutoff grid reacts to any signal change, while the remote-cutoff grid reacts only to stronger signal changes.
6AE7-GT – Dual Triode with a common, single anode, for use as a power triode driver
6AF4 – UHF Medium-mu Triode, commonly found in TV UHF tuners and converters.
6AF11 – Compactron High-mu dual triode and sharp-cutoff pentode
6AG11 – Compactron High-mu dual triode and dual diode
6AH5-G – Beam power tube for early TV use. Same as type 6L6-G, but with scrambled pinout. Used in some Philco receivers.
6AK5, EF95, 5654, CV4010, 6J1P (6Ж1П) – Miniature V.H.F. Sharp-cutoff pentode (Used in old Radiosonde weather balloon transmitters, receiver front ends and contemporary audio equipment), Miniature 7-pin base
6AK6 – Power pentode. 7-pin miniature version of type 6G6-G. Unusual low-power consumption output tube with 150 mA heater.
/EABC80 – Triple Diode, High-mu Triode. Diodes have identical characteristics – two have cathodes connected to the triode's cathode, one has a separate cathode. Used as a combination AM detector/AVC rectifier/FM ratio detector/A.F. amplifier in AM/FM radios manufactured outside of North America. Triode amplification factor: 70. North American type 6T8 is identical (but for a shorter glass envelope) and may be used as a substitute.
6AK9 – Compactron 1x high-mu + 1x medium-mu dual triode and beam power pentode, 12-pin base
6AK10 – Compactron High-mu triple triode for use as NTSC chroma signal demodulator matrix in analog color TV receivers, 12-pin base
6AL3, EY88 – TV "Damper/Efficiency" Diode
6AL5, EAA91, D77 – Dual Diode, Detector. Often used in vacuum tube volt meters (VTVMs). Miniature version of type 6H6.
6AL6-G – Beam power tube for early TV use. Same as type 6L6-G, but with scrambled pinout and anode connected to top cap.
6AL7-GT – Tuning indicator used in many early AM/FM Hi-Fi radios. Similar in function to "Magic Eye" tubes. Has two bar-shaped shadows; one grows to indicate signal strength, the other moves to indicate center tuning on FM.
6AM6, EF91, Z77 – Sharp-cutoff R.F. pentode used in receiver front ends and test gear such as VTVMs and TV broadcast modulation monitors.
6AN7, – Triode-Hexode Oscillator/Mixer (radio)
6AN8, – Triode-Pentode used in frame timebase circuits for television. Electrically fairly similar to ECL80 but with a different pinout.
6AQ5 – Beam-power pentode, 7-pin miniature similar of type 6V6.
6AQ8/ECC85 – Dual triode with internal shield. Designed for use as oscillator and mixer in FM receivers. The heater to cathode insulation is inadequate for use in cascode operation
6AR8, 6JH8, 6ME8 – Beam deflection tubes for use as NTSC chroma signal demodulators in analog color TV receivers
6AS6 – Pentode with a fine-pitched suppressor grid which could serve as a second control grid. Used in radar phantastron circuits.
6AS7, 6080 – Dual low-mu Triode, low impedance, mostly used for voltage regulation circuits.
6AS11 – Compactron 1x high-mu + 1x medium-mu dual triode and sharp-cutoff pentode, 12-pin base
6AT6 – Dual Diode, High-mu Triode, miniature version of type 6Q7. Triode amplification factor: 70.
6AU4 – TV "Damper/Efficiency" Diode
6AU6, EF94, 6AU6A – Sharp-cutoff pentode
6AV6 – Dual Diode, High-mu Triode, miniature version of type 75. Triode amplification factor: 100. (Triode section similar in characteristics to one half of a 12AX7.)
6AV11 – Compactron Medium-mu triple triode, 12-pin base
6AX4 – TV "Damper/Efficiency" Diode
6AX5 – Full-wave rectifier. Octal base. Similar in structure to type 6X5, but with higher voltage and current ratings which are comparable to those of types 5Y3 and 80.
6B6-G – Dual Diode, High-mu Triode. Octal version of type 75. Has top-cap connection for triode grid. Later octal version, type 6SQ7, has under-chassis connection for triode grid. Miniature version: 6AV6.
6B7 (UX7 base), 6B8 (EBF32, Octal base) – Dual Diode, Semiremote-cutoff Pentodes with control grid on top cap. Based on type 2B7 which had a 2.5 volt heater. The diode anodes are most commonly used as (second) detectors and AVC rectification in superheterodyne receivers. Because their control grids have both sharp-cutoff and remote-cutoff characteristics, these types were used as I.F. amplifiers with AVC bias to the control grid, and as A.F. amplifiers. These types were also used in reflex radios. In a typical 2B7/6B7/6B8 reflex circuit, the I.F. signal from the converter is injected into the pentode and is amplified. The diodes then act as detectors, separating the A.F. signal from the R.F. signal. The A.F. signal is then re-injected into the pentode, amplified, and sent to the audio output tube.
6BA6, EF93, W727, 5790 – Semiremote-cutoff R.F. Pentode (Often encountered in car radios)
6BD11 – Compactron 1x high-mu + 1x medium-mu dual triode and sharp-cutoff pentode, 12-pin base
6BE6, EK90, 5750, X727 – Pentagrid Converter (Often encountered in car radios)
6BF6 – Dual Diode, Medium-mu triode. Miniature version of octal type 6R7.
6BF8 – Sextuple diode with a common cathode
6BG6 – Beam tetrode, anode cap. Used in early TV magnetic-deflection horizontal-output stage.
6BH11 – Compactron Medium-mu dual triode and sharp-cutoff pentode
6BK4 – High Voltage beam Triode (30 kV anode voltage). Used as shunt regulator in color TV receivers and measurement equipment such as high voltage meters
6BK7 – Dual Triode with Internal shield between each section, used in RF circuits (Similar to 6BQ7)
6BK8, EF86, Z729 – Audio Pentode used in microphone preamplifiers and audiophile equipment
6BK11 – Compactron 2x High-mu + 1x medium-mu triple triode preamplifier, 12-pin base; used in some guitar amps made by Ampeg.
6BL6 (5836) – Sutton tube, a reflex klystron used as a 250 mW CW microwave source, 1.6 to 6.5 GHz depending upon an external cavity. 4-pin peewee base with cavity contact rings and top cap
6BL8, ECF80 – General-purpose Triode pentode used in TV, audio and test gear
6BM6 (5837) – Sutton tube used as a 150 mW CW microwave source, 550 MHz to 3.8 GHz depending upon an external cavity. 4-pin peewee base with cavity contact rings and top cap
6BM8, ECL82 – Triode pentode used as the driver and output stages in audio amplifiers, audio output and vertical output stages in TV receivers and has even been seen in an electronic nerve stimulator.
6BN6 – Gated-beam discriminator pentode, used in radar, dual channel oscilloscopes and F.M. quadrature detectors (cf. 6DT6, nonode).
6BQ5, EL84,(N709) – 5.7 Watts AF Power pentode, noval base
6BQ6-GT – Beam Power Pentode, used as a Horizontal Deflection Output tube in monochrome TV receivers of the 1950s. (However, may be found in some larger models.) Larger receivers often used similar type 6DQ6. Later versions of this tube branded as 6BQ6-GTB/6CU6.
6BQ7 – Dual RF/VHF triode with internal screen. The two sections can be used independently or in a cascode stage
6BQ7A – Improved 6BQ7 capable of operation at UHF frequencies
6BU8 – Split Anode TV Sync Separator
6BX6, EF80 – Sharp-cutoff RF/IF/Video pentode, noval base
6BY6 – Similar to type 6CS6, but with higher transconductance. 3BY6 with a different heater
6BY7, EF85, W719 – Remote-cutoff R.F. Pentode (TV IF)
6BZ6 – Sharp-cutoff R.F. pentode used in video I.F. circuits of the 1960s.
6BZ7 – Dual Triode. See 6BK7
6C4/EC90 – 3.6 W small-power V.H.F. triode up to 150 MHz; single 12AU7/ECC82 system
6C6 – Sharp-cutoff R.F. Pentode. Most common commercial uses were as a tuned R.F. amplifier, a detector, and an A.F. amplifier. Also used in test equipment. Has UX6 base with top cap. Based on type 57, which had a 2.5 volt heater. Similar to types 1603, 77 and octal types 6J7 and 6SJ7
6C10 – Compactron High-mu triple triode, 12-pin base – not related to the Mazda/EdiSwan 6C10 triode-hexode
6CA4, EZ81 – Full Wave Rectifier
6CA7, EL34 – Audio Power Output Pentode
6CA11 – Compactron High-mu dual triode and sharp-cutoff pentode
6CB6 – Remote-cutoff R.F. Pentode used in video I.F. circuits of the 1950s and early 1960s.
6CG7 – Dual Triode (used in TV and some audio amplifiers including modern solid-state designs often as a cathode follower, similar to 6SN7)
6CJ6 – Line Output Pentode
6CL6 – Power pentode
6CM5, EL36, EL360 – Audio and TV Line Output Beam Power Tetrode.
6CW4 – Nuvistor high-mu VHF triode, most common one in consumer electronics
6CZ5 – Beam pentode for use in vertical deflection or audio amplifier. In certain applications, it can be used in place of a 6973.
6D4 – 25 mAavg, 100 mApeak Indirectly heated, argon triode thyratron, negative starter voltage, miniature 7-pin base; found an additional use as a 0 to 10 MHz noise source, when operated as a diode (starter tied to cathode) in a transverse 375 G magnetic field. Sufficiently filtered for "flatness" ("white noise") in a band of interest, such noise was used for testing radio receivers, servo systems and occasionally in analog computing as a random value source.
6D6 – Remote-Cutoff R.F. Pentode. Most common commercial uses were as an I.F. amplifier or as a superheterodyne mixer, aka 1st detector. Also used in test equipment. Has UX6 base with top cap. Based on type 58, which had a 2.5 volt heater. Similar to type 78. Octal version: 6U7-G.
6D8-G – Pentagrid converter, similar to type 6A8. Octal base with top cap. Has 150 mA heater. Used in pre-war 6-volt farm radios.
6D10 – High-mu triple triode for use as oscillator, mixer, amplifier or AFC tube, 12-pin base
6DA6, EF89 – R.F. Pentode used in AM/FM radios manufactured outside North America.
6DJ8, ECC88, E88CC, 6922, 6N23P, 6N11 – Dual Audio and R.F. Triode (often used in TV broadcast equipment, test gear, oscilloscopes and audiophile gear) similar to 6ES8
6DQ6 – Beam Power Pentode, used as a Horizontal Deflection Output tube in monochrome TV receivers of the 1950s. Smaller receivers often used similar type 6BQ6-GT. Also used as Audio Output tubes in Standel guitar amplifiers. Later versions branded as 6DQ6-B/6GW6.
6DR8, EBF83 – R.F. pentode which will operate with 12 V anode supply, used as I.F. amplifier in car radios which run directly off the 13.5 volt supply.
6DS4 – Nuvistor VHF triode used in TV tuners immediately prior to the introduction of solid state tuning circuits. (RCA TVs equipped with a 6DS4 tuner bore the trademark "Nu-Vista Vision"); successor of the 6CW4.
6DS8, ECH83 – Triode-heptode Local oscillator-Mixer which will operate with 12 V anode supply, used in car radios which run directly off the 13.5 volt supply.
6DT6 – Quadrature detector used in TV audio circuits of the 1950s and early 1960s; cf. 6BN6, nonode.
6DV4 – Medium-mu Nuvistor triode for UHF oscillators; some versions had a gold-plated envelope
6DX8 – Triode pentode
6E5 – "Magic Eye" Tuning indicator. Has incorporated driver triode with sharp-cutoff grid which makes it extremely sensitive to any changes in signal strength. Has UX6 base. Based on type 2E5, which had a 2.5 volt heater.
6EM5 – TV Vertical Output Pentode
6ES6, EF98 – R.F. pentode which will operate with 12 V anode supply, used as tuned R.F. amplifier in car radios which run directly off the 13.5 volt supply.
6ES8, ECC89, E89CC – Dual Triode used as cascode R.F. amplifier in TV tuners and V.H.F. receiver front ends, also used as general-purpose dual triode in test gear, similar to 6DJ8
6EZ8 – High-mu triple triode, Noval base
6F4 – Acorn UHF triode up to 1.2 GHz, for use as an oscillator
6F5 – High-mu triode, equal to triode section of type 6Q7
6F6 (KT63) – Power Pentode. Octal base version of type 42. Moderate power output rating – 9 watts max. (Single-ended Class-A circuit); 11 watts max. (Push-pull Class-A circuit); 19 watts max. (push-pull Class-AB2 circuit). Available in metal (numbered "6F6"), shouldered glass ("6F6-G"), and cylindrical glass ("6F6-GT"). Sometimes used as a transformer-coupled audio driver for types 6L6-GC and 807 when those tubes were used in Class-AB2 or Class-B amplifiers. Also used as a Class-C oscillator/amplifier in transmitters.
6F7 – Remote-cutoff Pentode, Medium-mu Triode. Has UX7 base with top-cap connection for the pentode's control grid (grid 1). Most common uses were as superheterodyne mixer ("first detector") and local oscillator, or as a combination I.F. amplifier (pentode) and (second) detector or A.F. amplifier (triode). Octal version: 6P7-G.
6FH8 – Medium-mu triode and three-anode sharp-cutoff tetrode for use in TV receivers and complex wave generators
6G5 – "Magic Eye" Tuning indicator. Has incorporated triode with remote-cutoff grid, which makes it less reactive to low-level changes in signal strength. Has UX6 base. Electronically identical to type 6U5 except for indicator. Both types had "pie wedge" shadow indicators. At first, the shadow indicator for type 6G5 was fully closed at zero signal and opened as signal strength increased. For type 6U5, the shadow indicator was fully open at zero signal and closed as signal strength increased. After World War II, type 6G5 was discontinued as a unique tube and all 6U5s were double-branded either as 6G5/6U5 or 6U5/6G5.
6G6-G – Power pentode. Octal base. Low power output – 1.1 watt max. output. Has 150 mA heater. Used in pre-war 6-volt farm radios. Miniature version – 6AK6.
6G8-G – Dual Diode, Sharp-cutoff Pentode (Used as Detector and first A.F. stage in Australian 1940s radios)
6GK5 – Miniature V.H.F. triode (Used as V.H.F. local oscillator in some T.V. Turret Tuners)
6GM5 – Beam power pentode, identical to 7591 and 7868 with a Noval base
6GV8, ECL85 – Triode Pentode (TV vertical output)
6GW8, ECL86 – Audio Triode Pentode (audio, TV vertical output)
6GY8 – High-mu triple triode for use as oscillator, mixer, RF amplifier or AFC tube, Noval base
6H6, D63, EB34, OSW3109 – Dual diode. Octal base. Most commonly found as a "stubby" metal envelope tube. Glass versions 6H6-G and 6H6-GT are also found.
6HS8 – Dual-anode pentode for TV receiver sync separation service or as a two-channel VCA
6J5 (Metal), 6J5GT (Glass Tubular), L63 – Heater cathode type, medium-mu triode, identical to 12J5 except heater characteristics
6J5WGT – Premium version of 6J5GT, identical to 12J5WGT except heater characteristics
6J6 – Dual general purpose VHF triode with common cathodes, operates over much of the UHF band (up to 600 MHz), equivalent to ECC91
6J7, EF37 – Sharp-cutoff Pentode. Most common commercial uses were as a tuned R.F. amplifier, a (second) detector, or an A.F. amplifier. Octal version of type 77. This type included a top-cap connection for the control grid. Later version, type 6SJ7, had its control grid connection on pin 4.
6J8-G – Triode-Heptode (radio local oscillator/mixer)
6JU8A – 9 mA, Quad diode, units 1&2 and 3&4 internally series-connected
6K6-G – Power Pentode, octal version of type 41. Low-to-moderate power output rating – 0.35 to 4.5 watts (single-ended Class-A circuit); 10.5 watts max. (push-pull Class-A circuit).
6K7, EF39 – Remote-cutoff R.F. pentode. Most common commercial uses were as an I.F. amplifier or as a superheterodyne mixer, aka 1st detector. Also used in test equipment. Octal version of type 78. This type included a top-cap connection for the control grid. Later version, type 6SK7, had its control grid connection on pin 4.
6K8 and 12K8 – American Triode-Hexode mixer, 1938
6K11 – Compactron 2x High-mu + 1x medium-mu triple triode, 12-pin base
6KM8 – Diode and three-anode sharp-cutoff tetrode for use in musical instruments, frequency dividers and complex wave generators
6L4 – Acorn UHF triode for use as an oscillator
6L5-G – Medium-mu triode (Similar to type 6J5-G, available only in ST shape)
6L6 (EL37) – High-powered beam tetrode.
There are several variations. Except for types 6L6-GC and 6L6-GX, all have the same maximum output ratings:

11.5 watts (single-ended Class-A circuit)
14.5 watts (push-pull Class-A circuit)
34 watts (push-pull Class-AB1 circuit)
60 watts (push-pull Class-AB2 circuit)

6L6 (metal envelope) and 6L6-G (shouldered glass envelope) were used in pre-World War II radios and Public Address amplifiers.
6L6 and 25L6 were introduced in 1935 as the first beam tetrodes. Both types were branded with the L6 ending to signify their (then) uniqueness among audio output tubes. However, this is the only similarity between the two tubes. (Type 6W6-GT is the 6.3 volt heater version of types 25L6-GT and 50L6-GT.)

6L6GA – Post-war version of type 6L6-G, in smaller ST-14 shape with Shouldered Tubular, (ST), shaped bulb, revision A.
6L6GB – Post-war improved version in a cylindrical glass envelope. Similar to type 5881.
6L6GTB – 6L6 with Tubular, (T), shaped bulb, revision B, (higher power rating, as it happens. The 6L6GTB can always replace the 6L6, 6L6G, and 6L6GT, but a 6L6GTB running at maximum rating should not be replaced with another subtype).
6L6-WGB – "Industrial" version of type 6L6GB.
6L6GC – Final and highest-powered audio version of the tube. Max. outputs:
17.5 watts (single-ended Class-A circuit)
32 watts (push-pull Class-A circuit)
55 watts (push-pull Class-AB1 circuit)
60 watts (push-pull Class-AB2 circuit)

6L6-GX – Class-C oscillator/amplifier used in transmitters. Max. output 30 watts. (All versions may be used as a Class-C oscillator/amplifier, but this version is specifically designed for this purpose, has a special ceramic base.)
6L7 – Pentagrid converter often used in console radios of the late 1930s. Similar in structure to pentode-triode pentagrid converters 6SA7 and 6BE6, except that a separate oscillator – usually type 6C5 – is required. Also, grid 1 is remote-cutoff control grid, grid 3 is oscillator input grid. (In types 6SA7 and 6BE6, grid 1 is the internal oscillator grid, grid 3 is the control grid.) Because of low conversion transconductance, radios using type 6L7 typically have either a tuned RF pre-amplifier stage, or at least two stages of I.F. amplification. (A few models have both.)
6LF6 – Beam power tetrode with a duodecar Compactron base and anode cap, for CRT horizontal-deflection amplifiers
6M5 – Audio Output Pentode (Used as Class-A or C output stages of 1950s Australian radiograms) similar to 6BQ5
6M11 – Compactron Dual triode and pentode
6MD8 – Medium-mu triple triode for use as NTSC chroma signal demodulator matrix in analog color TV receivers, B9E Novar 9-pin base
6ME5 – "Magic Eye"-type tuning indicator, miniature 7-pin base

6MK8 – Dual-anode pentode for TV receiver sync separation service or as a two-channel VCA
6MJ8 – Medium-mu triple triode for use as NTSC chroma signal demodulator matrix in analog color TV receivers, 12-pin base
6MN8 – High-mu triple triode for use as NTSC chroma signal demodulator matrix in analog color TV receivers, 12-pin base
6N3, EY82 – Half-Wave Rectifier
6N5 – Tuning indicator
6N7 – Dual Power Triode, used as Class-A audio driver or as Class-B power output (also 6N7-G and 6N7-GT). Max. output (Class-B) – 10 watts. Octal version of type 6A6.
6N8, EBF80 – Remote-cutoff pentode, dual diode. (detector plus RF or AF amplifier in radios)
6P5-G/GT – Medium-mu triode, Octal version of type 76, often used as driver for type 6AC5-G.
6P7-G – Rarely seen octal version of type 6F7.
6Q5-G – Triode gas thyratron used in DuMont oscilloscopes as a sweep generator. Identical to type 884.
6Q11 – Medium-mu triple triode, 12-pin base, for use as a sync clipper and gated AGC amplifier in TV receivers
6R3, EY81 – TV "Damper/Efficiency" Diode
6R7 – Dual Diode, Medium-mu Triode (also 6R7-G and 6R7-GT). Octal base with top cap. Miniature version – 6BF6. Amplification factor: 16.
6S7-G – Remote-cutoff RF Pentode, similar to type 6K7. Octal base with top cap. Has 150 ms heater. Used in pre-war 6-volt farm radios.
6S8-GT – Triple Diode, High-mu Triode. Octal tube with top-cap connection to triode grid. Has three identical diodes – two diodes share a cathode with the triode, one has a separate cathode. Used as a combined AM detector/AVC rectifier/FM ratio detector/A.F. amplifier in AM/FM radios. Typically, all sections of this tube are arranged around a single heater.
6SA7 – First pentode-triode style pentagrid converter. Octal type. Miniature version: 6BE6.
6SB7Y (octal), 6BA7 and 12BA7 (Noval) – VHF pentagrids, 1946
6SC7 – High-mu dual triode (Both sections share a single cathode)
6SK7 – Remote-cutoff pentode (Used in I.F. stages of North American radios) Miniature version: 6BD6
6SL7, ECC35 – Dual triode (Used in TV and general electronics)
6SN7, ECC32, B65, 13D2, CV1986, 6042 – Medium-mu dual triode (Used in Audio Amplifiers, Hammond Organs and Television; extensive use in World War II radar) Each section is equivalent to a 6J5. Miniature version: 12AU7
6SS7 – Remote-cutoff pentode (150 mA heater version of the 6SK7, found in some AA6 radios as both the RF amplifier and first IF). This is the only tube to have a same-letter repetition
6T5 – "Magic Eye" Tuning indicator. Has incorporated driver triode with remote-cutoff grid. Has UX6 base. Shadow indicator is fully closed at zero signal. As signal increases, shadow grows outward from the center, covering the entire circumference of the indicator. Electronically identical to types 6G5 and 6U5, which may be used as substitutes.
6T7-G – Dual diode, high-mu triode, similar to type 6Q7. Octal base with top cap. Has 150 mA heater. Used in pre-war farm radios.
 – Triple Diode, High-mu Triode. Has three identical diodes – two have cathodes connected to the triode's cathode, one has a separate cathode. Triode amplification factor: 70. Used as an AM detector/AVC rectifier/FM ratio detector/A.F. amplifier in North American AM/FM radios. Identical to type 6AK8/EABC80, but with a shorter glass envelope.
6U5 (UX6 base), 6U5G (Octal base) – "Magic Eye" Tuning indicator. Has incorporated driver triode with remote-cutoff grid. Has "pie wedge" shadow indicator that is open at zero signal and closes as signal increases. Electronically identical to types 6G5 and 6T5 and may be used as a substitute for those types. After World War II, most new 6U5s were double-branded as either 6G5/6U5 or 6U5/6G5.
6U7-G – Remote-cutoff R.F. Pentode. Most common commercial uses were as an I.F. amplifier or as a superheterodyne mixer, aka 1st detector. Also used in test equipment. Octal version of type 6D6. Most direct substitute: 6K7. Similar to types 58, 78 and 6SK7.
6U8A – Triode-pentode, Noval base. Audio preamplifier.
6U10 – 1x High-mu + 2x medium-mu triple triode, 12-pin base
6V4 (EZ80) – Noval-base, indirectly heated, full-wave rectifier. EZ80 rated at 90mA, but 6V4 only rated for 70. Some brands were identical.
6V6 – Beam power tetrode, used in single-ended Class-A audio output stages of radios and sometimes seen in Class-B audio amplifiers (see also: 5V6 and 12V6). Electrically similar to 6AQ5/EL90.
6V6G – 6V6 with Shouldered Tubular, (ST), shaped bulb.
6V6GT – 6V6 with Tubular, (T), shaped bulb.
6V7-G – Dual diode, Medium-mu Triode. Octal version of type 85. Amplification factor: 8.3. Similar to type 6R7.
6W6-GT – Beam power pentode, used most often as a Vertical Deflection Output tube in monochrome TV receivers of the 1950s. Can also used as an Audio Output tube. This is the 6.3 volt heater version of types 25L6-GT and 50L6-GT.
6X4 (EZ90) and 6X5 (EZ35) – Full-wave rectifiers with indirectly heated common cathode. Type 6X4 has a 7-pin miniature base, the 6X5 has an octal base. Based on type 84/6Z4. No longer in production.

"7" prefix Loctal tubes
These tubes all have 6.3 volt AC/DC heaters.
7A4 – Medium-mu triode, Loctal version of type 6J5, often numbered 7A4/XXL
7A5 – Beam power pentode, Loctal version of type 6U6GT
7A6 – Dual detector diode, similar to type 6H6
7A7 – Remote-cutoff pentode, Loctal version of type 6SK7
7A8 – The only octode pentagrid converter produced in America by Sylvania, 1939. Used mostly in Philco radios.
7AB7 – Sharp-cutoff pentode
7AD7 – Power pentode
7AF7 – Dual medium-mu triode
7AG7 – Sharp-cutoff pentode
7AH7 – Remote-cutoff pentode
7AJ7 – Sharp-cutoff pentode
7AK7 – Sharp-cutoff, dual control pentode for computer service. Perhaps the first active device specifically designed for computer use.
7B4 – High-mu triode, Loctal version of types 6F5 and 6SF5
7B5 – Power pentode, Loctal version of types 6K6 and 41
7B6 – High-mu triode, dual detector diodes, Loctal version of type 75, similar to types 6AV6 and 6SQ7
7B7 – Remote-cutoff pentode
7B8 – Pentagrid converter, Loctal version of types 6A7 and 6A8
7C4 – High frequency diode
7C5 – Beam power pentode, Loctal version of type 6V6
7C6 – High-mu triode, dual detector diode
7C7 – Sharp-cutoff pentode
7E5 – Medium-mu high-frequency triode
7E6 – Medium-mu triode, dual detector diode, Loctal version of types 6R7 and 6SR7, electronically identical to miniature type 6BF6.
7E7 – Semiremote-cutoff pentode, dual detector diode, similar to types 6B7 and 6B8
7F7 – High-mu dual triode, Loctal version of type 6SL7-GT
7F8 – Medium-mu VHF triode, used as amplifier or converter
7G7 – Sharp-cutoff pentode
7G8 – Sharp-cutoff dual tetrode
7H7 – Semiremote-cutoff pentode
7J7 – Triode-heptode converter, similar to type 6J8-G
7K7 – High-mu triode, dual detector diode, similar to types 6AT6 and 6Q7
7L7 – Sharp-cutoff pentode
7N7 – Dual medium-mu triode, Loctal version of type 6SN7-GT
7Q7 – Pentagrid converter, similar to type 6SA7
7R7 – Remote-cutoff pentode, dual detector diode
7S7 – Triode-heptode converter
7T7 – Sharp-cutoff pentode
7V7 – Sharp-cutoff pentode; 7W7 but with the suppressor grid on pin 4, an internal shield on pin 5, and the cathode on pin 7
7W7 – Sharp-cutoff pentode; 7V7 but with the suppressor grid and internal shield on pin 5, and the cathode on pins 4 and 7
Note: When substituting a 7V7 for a 7W7 or vice-versa, verify connections on socket pins 4 and 7; pin 5 is usually connected to the chassis
7X6 – Dual rectifier diode
7X7 – High-mu triode, dual detector diodes on separate cathodes, used as FM discriminator and AF amplifier, often numbered 7X7/XXFM
7Y4 – Full-wave rectifier
7Z4 – Full-wave rectifier

12 volt heater tubes
12A5 – Power pentode. UX7 base. Center-tapped 12.6 V/300 mA resp. 6.3 V/600 mA heater. Mostly used in pre-war car radios.
12A7 – Power pentode, rectifier diode. Pentode section is similar to type 38. Diode has a low power rating – 120 volt, 30 mA – that limits the number of tubes that can be tied to its B+ circuit. Used in one-tube portable phonographs and a few two- and three-tube radios. Forerunner of such types as 32L7-GT, 70L7-GT and 117L7-GT. UX7 base with top cap. Not related to types 2A7 and 6A7.
12AB5 – Beam Power Tube
12AC10 – Compactron High-mu triple triode for use as NTSC chroma signal demodulator matrix in analog color TV receivers, 12-pin base
12AE10 – Compactron Beam power tube and sharp-cutoff pentode
12AL5 – Dual diode (similar to 6AL5 except for heater)
12AT6 – Dual diode/triode (Commonly replaced by 12AV6 in consumer radios)
12AT7, ECC81, 6060, B309, M8162 – High-mu dual triode. Commonly used as R.F. amplifier/mixer in VHF circuits.
12AU7, ECC82, 6067, B329, M8136 – Medium-mu dual triode. Two 6C4/EC90s in one envelope; however, it is only specified as an audio frequency device. Commonly used in audio applications and TV receivers.
12AV6 – Dual diode/High-mu triode (see also: 6AV6)
12AV7, 5965 – Medium-mu dual triode. Principally designed for VHF amplifier/mixer operation.
12AX7, ECC83, 6057, B327, M8137 – High-mu dual triode. Very similar to triode section of 6AV6. Commonly used in high-gain audio stages and as power inverters in class A/B amplifiers.
12AW7 – See 12DW7 below. Called AW by some, but proper name is DW.
12AY7 – Dual Triode. Medium gain but low noise, intended for low-level/preamplifier use.
12AZ7 – Dual Triode. Medium-mu, AF Amplifier, or combined oscillator and mixer, Noval base.
12B4A – Low-mu triode, noval base.
12BA6 – Remote-cutoff pentode, 6BA6/EF93 with a different heater
12BE6 – Pentagrid converter, 6BE6/EK90 with a different heater
12BH7 – Dual Triode, Medium-mu, designed for use in equipment having series heater-string arrangement.
12BY7 – Video Amplifier Pentode
12DT5 – Beam Power Pentode
12DT6 – Sharp-cutoff pentode
12DW7/ECC832, 7247 – Dissimilar triodes. One half 12AX7 value, other half 12AU7 value.
12EG6 – Pentagrid converter, both grids 1 and 3 are sharp-cutoff, has 12.6 volt anode and screen grid voltage, for use in car radios
12FA6 – Low-anode voltage, car radio version of 12BE6 pentagrid converter
12FQ8 – Common-cathode, dual split-anode triode for use in musical instruments, frequency dividers and complex wave generators
12FX8 – Low-anode voltage, triode-heptode converter for car radios
12GA6 – Similar to type 12FA6, but with lower conversion transconductance
12J5WGT – Heater cathode type, medium-mu triode, identical to 6J5WGT except heater characteristics
12K5 – Low-anode voltage tetrode with a space charge grid
12MD8 – Medium-mu triple triode for use as NTSC chroma signal demodulator matrix in analog color TV receivers, B9E Novar 9-pin base
12MN8 – High-mu triple triode for use as NTSC chroma signal demodulator matrix in analog color TV receivers, B12C Duodecar 12-pin base
12SA7 – Pentagrid converter (Octal version of 12BE6)
12SK7 – Remote-cutoff Pentode (Octal version of 12BA6)
12SQ7 – Dual diode, triode (Octal version of 12AV6)
12U5G – Tuning indicator identical to 6U5G except heater characteristics
12Z3 – Half-wave rectifier, UX4 base

"14" prefix Loctal tubes
These tubes all have 12.6 volt AC/DC heaters
14A4 – Medium-mu triode, Loctal version of type 12J5
14A5 – Beam power pentode
14A7 – Remote-cutoff pentode, often numbered 14A7/12B7
14AF7 – Dual medium-mu triodes, often numbered 14AF7/XXD
14B6 – High-mu triode, dual detector diode, similar to types 12AV6 and 12SQ7
14B8 – Pentagrid converter, Loctal version of type 12A8
14C5 – Beam power pentode, Loctal version of type 12V6-GT
14C7 – Sharp-cutoff pentode
14E6 – Medium-mu triode, dual detector diode, Loctal version of 12SR7
14E7 – Semiremote-cutoff pentode, dual detector diode, similar to type 12C8
14F7 – High-mu dual triode, Loctal version of type 12SL7-GT
14F8 – Medium-mu VHF triode, used as amplifier or converter
14H7 – Semiremote-cutoff pentode
14J7 – Triode-heptode converter
14N7 – Dual medium-mu triode, Loctal version of type 12SN7-GT
14Q7 – Pentagrid converter, similar to type 12SA7
14R7 – Remote-cutoff pentode, dual detector diode
14S7 – Triode-heptode converter
14W7 – Sharp-cutoff pentode
14X7 – High-mu triode, dual detector diodes on separate cathodes, used as FM discriminator and AF amplifier
14Y4 – Dual rectifier diode

17 volt heater tubes
17EW8, HCC85 – Dual High-mu triode

25 volt series heater tubes
25A6 – Power pentode, octal version of type 43
25C5 – Beam Power Pentode (Identical to the 50C5 but with a 25 V 300 mA heater)
25F5 – Beam Power Pentode (Identical to the 50C5, but with a 25 V 150 mA heater, used in some AA5 type radios using push-pull output)
25L6 – Beam-power pentode (Except for heater, electrically identical to type 50L6)
25Z5 – Dual rectifier diode
25Z6 – Octal version of 25Z5

35 volt series heater tubes
35A5 – Beam Power Tube (Loctal, Similar to 35L6)
35B5 – Beam power tube
35C5 – Identical to 35B5 except for basing ("pin-out") arrangement (HL92)
35DZ8 – High-mu Triode/Beam Power tube (Like the 35HB8, used for audio)
35HB8 – Triode/Beam Power tube (Used primarily as both the audio amplifier and output)
35L6-GT – Beam power pentode similar to, but not electronically identical to, types 25L6-GT and 50L6-GT
35W4 – Rectifier diode
35Y4 – Rectifier Diode (Loctal, similar to 35Z5)
35Z3 – Rectifier Diode (Loctal, Similar to 35Z4)
35Z4-GT – Rectifier diode
35Z5-GT – Similar to 35Z4-GT, but equipped with a heater tap used to power a pilot light

50 volt series heater tubes
50A5 – Beam Power Tube (Loctal, similar to 50L6)
50B5 – Beam power tube, similar to 35B5 but with 50 volt heater
50C5 – Similar to 35C5 but with 50 volt heater, and 50B5 except for basing ("pin-out") arrangement
50DC4 – Rectifier diode (Similar to 35W4 except for heater)
50EH5 – Beam Power tube, (Similar to 50C5 but with higher gain, some radios that use this tube do not have an audio amplifier section.)
50HK6 – Power pentode (Filament is tapped for use with a dial lamp)
50L6 – Beam power tube (see also 25L6)
50X6 – Dual Diode (Loctal, commonly used as a rectifier-doubler)

117 volt heater tubes
All of the following tubes are designed to operate with their heaters connected directly to the 117 volt (now 120 volt) electrical mains of North America. All of them use indirectly heated cathodes. All of them incorporate at least one rectifier diode.
Rectifier diode – Beam power pentode combinations
117L7GT
117M7GT
117N7GT
117P7GT
Rectifier tubes
117Z3 – Single diode, 7-pin miniature version of 117Z4GT
117Z4GT
117Z6GT – Dual diode, can be used as a voltage doubler

Other tubes with nonstandard heater voltages
The tubes in this list are most commonly used in series-wired circuits.
2AF4 – UHF triode oscillator
2BN4 – VHF triode
2CW4 – Nuvistor high-mu VHF triode, 6CW4 with a 2.1 volt/450 mA heater; used in TV receivers with series heater strings
2CY5 – VHF sharp-cutoff tetrode
2EA5 – VHF sharp-cutoff tetrode
2EN5 – Dual diode
2ER5 – VHF triode
2ES5 – VHF triode
2EV5 – VHF sharp-cutoff tetrode
2FH5 – VHF triode
2FQ5 – VHF triode
2FV6 – VHF sharp-cutoff tetrode
2FY5 – VHF triode
4CB6 – Sharp-cutoff pentode
5J6 – General purpose RF dual triode with common cathodes, a 6J6 with a 4.7 volt/600 mA controlled warm-up heater
7AU7 – Medium-mu Dual triode with a center-tapped 7.0/3.5 V heater, like the 12AU7
7KY6 – Sharp-cutoff frame-grid pentode with a 7.3 volt nominal heater voltage for use as video output tube in TV receivers, Noval base
8AC10 – Compactron High-mu triple triode for use as NTSC chroma signal demodulator matrix in analog color TV receivers, 12-pin base
8B10 – Compactron Dual triode and dual diode
8FQ7/8CG7 – Dual triode (8 V version of the common 6CG7)
10DE7 – Dual triode (dissimilar triode sections)
11DS5 – Beam Power tube (11 V heater version of the 50B5/35B5)
13CW4 – Nuvistor used as a preamplifier in Neumann condenser microphones U-47 and U-48 after the production of the VF14 ceased
18FX6 – Pentagrid converter (18 V version of the 12BE6)
18FY6 – Dual diode/triode (18 V version of the 12AV6)
34GD5 – Beam power tube (34 V version of the 35C5/50C5)
36AM3 – Half-wave rectifier (36 V version of the 35W4)
38HE7 – Compactron Diode and beam power tube
38HK7 – Compactron Diode and beam power tube

List of RMA professional tubes

1B23 – 20 kW, 400 to 1500 MHz Gas-filled, cold-cathode Transmit/Receive Tube (TR cell)
1B41 – Gas-filled, cold-cathode 9.5 kV, 450 A spark gap
1B45 – Gas-filled, cold-cathode 14 kV, 450 A spark gap
1B49 – Gas-filled, cold-cathode 12 kV, 450 A spark gap
1C21 – Gas-filled, 25 mAavg, 100 mApeak, triode thyratron
1D21 – Strobotron Gas-filled, 50 mAavg, 5 Apeak, luminescent tetrode thyratron for use as a stroboscope lamp
1P21 – 9-stage Photomultiplier, spectral S4 response, 11-pin base
1P25 – Infrared image converter used in World War II night vision "sniperscopes".
1P29 – Gas-filled phototube, spectral S3 response, 4-pin base
1P39 – Vacuum Phototube, spectral S4 response, 4-pin base
1S22 – 10 kV, 20 A Vacuum SPDT switch
2C21 – Dual transmitting triode, indirectly heated, 7-pin base plus a single top cap for one of the grids
2C22 – Transmitting triode, indirectly heated, Octal base plus dual top cap for grid and anode
2C36 – Rocket-type disk-seal UHF triode with an internal feedback circuit between cathode and anode, for use as UHF oscillator up to 1.75 GHz
2C37 – Rocket triode for use as SHF oscillator up to 3.3 GHz
2C39A – Oil can-type disk-seal UHF power triode with glass spacers up to 3 GHz, Panode = 100 W
2C39B – 2C39A with ceramic spacers
2C40 – Lighthouse-type disk-seal UHF power triode for continuous operation, Panode = 6.5 W at 3370 MHz
2C41 – Oil can UHF power triode for pulsed operation, 2200 Wpeak at 3 GHz
2C42 – Lighthouse UHF power triode for pulsed operation, 1750 Wpeak at 1050 MHz; improved 446
2C43 – Lighthouse UHF power triode, indirectly heated, up to 3.37 GHz, 6-pin base
2C46 – Lighthouse UHF power triode
2C51 – Dual shielded triode, indirectly heated, Noval base
/EN91 (PL21, PL2D21, CV797) – 100 mAavg, 500 mApeak, 10 Asurge, Gas-filled, indirectly heated tetrode thyratron, negative starter voltage, miniature 7-pin base, for relay and grid-controlled rectifier service, used in jukeboxes and computer equipment.
2E22 – 53 W Power pentode, 5-pin base with anode on top cap
2E26 – Popular amateur 5.3 W VHF beam power tetrode up to 175 MHz, octal base
 – 10 W Directly heated beam power tetrode with deflection screens available on separate pin, miniature 7-pin base
2E31 – Subminiature, directly heated, fully shielded sharp-cutoff RF/IF pentode, 5-pin all-glass wire-ended, FL
2E32 – Similar to 2E31, SL
2E35 – 6 mW Subminiature directly heated power pentode, 5-pin all-glass wire-ended, FL
2E36 – Similar to 2E35, SL
2E41 – Diode, pentode, FL
2E42 – Similar to 2E42, SL
2F21 – Indirectly heated hexode monoscope, Indian Head test pattern, 6-pin base with dual top caps for grid4 and anode
2G21 – Directly heated triode-heptode mixer, 7-pin all-glass wire-ended
2G41 – Triode-heptode converter, FL
2G42 – Similar to type 2G42, SL
2H21 – Phasitron, a magnetically controlled beam-deflection phase modulator tube similar to the 5593, used in early FM broadcast transmitters
2J30 to 2J34 – 300 kW S-band Magnetrons
2J55 and 2J56 – 40 kW X-band Magnetrons for use as pulsed oscillator
2K25 – 25 mW 8.5 to 9.66 GHz Reflex Klystron
2K50 – 15 mW 23.5 to 24.5 GHz Reflex Klystron
2P23 – Early image orthicon TV camera tube.
3B28 – Xenon half wave rectifier; ruggedized replacement for mercury vapor type 866.
3C22 – Disk-seal UHF power triode, Panode = 125 W with forced-air cooling, 1.4 GHz
3C23 – 1.5 Aavg, 6 Apeak, Mercury-vapor triode thyratron, 4-pin base with anode top cap
3C45 – 45 mAavg, 1.5 ARMS, 35 Apeak, Half-indirectly heated hydrogen triode thyratron, 4-pin base with anode top cap
3D21 – Indirectly heated beam power tetrode, Octal base with anode top cap
3D22 – Gas-filled, 800 mAavg, 8 Apeak, tetrode thyratron, 7-pin base
3E29 – Dual beam power tube used in radar equipment; a pulse rated variant of the earlier 829B, Septar 7-pin base with dual anode top cap.
4B32 – 10 kV, 1.25 Aavg, 5 Apeak Xenon half wave rectifier
4D21 (6155, Eimac 4-125A) – 125 W Glass VHF beam power tetrode
4E27 – 125 W Glass radial-beam power pentode
4J31 to 4J35 – 1 MW S-band Magnetrons
5B24 – Tungar bulb, a low-voltage, mercury-vapor, full wave rectifier for charging 60-cell lead-acid batteries at 6 A; 2.5 V, 24 A heater
5C22 – Half-indirectly heated, hydrogen triode thyratron for radar modulators.
5D22 (6156, Eimac 4-250A) – 250 W, 110 MHz Glass beam power tetrode
5J26 – 500 kW, 1.22 to 1.35 GHz S-band Magnetrons
6C21 – Triode radar modulator for "hard tube" pulsers.
7C23 – 120 kW Power triode for high voltage pulse operation.
8D21 – Internally water cooled dual tetrode used in early VHF TV transmitters.
9C21 – 100 kW Water-cooled power triode, directly heated, 4-pin base with dual top caps for grid and anode

List of EIA professional tubes

Note: Most of these are special quality versions of the equivalents given. Some manufacturers preceded the EIA number with a manufacturer's code, as explained above.

5000s

5331, 5332, 5514 – Directly heated power triodes, 4-pin base with anode top cap
5556 – Directly heated power triode, 4-pin base
5593 – Phasitron, a magnetically controlled beam-deflection phase modulator tube similar to the 2H21, used in early FM broadcast transmitters
5608 – Dual power triode, designed for use with AC anode voltage and critical grid leak requirements
5651 – 86-volts, cold-cathode, glow-discharge voltage reference, 7-pin miniature base
5654, CV4010, 408A – VHF pentode; common in vintage radar IF amplifiers; premium version of 6AK5, EF95, 6J1P (6Ж1П)
5678 (CK5678 Raytheon) – 5 leads subminiature shielded pentode for RF applications
5691 – Special Red ruggedized long-life high-mu triode for industrial applications
5692 – Special Red ruggedized long-life medium-mu triode for industrial applications
5693 – Special Red ruggedized long-life sharp-cutoff pentode for industrial applications
5704 – Subminiature diode, all-glass wire-ended
5727 – 650 V, 100 mAavg, 500 mApeak, 10 Asurge Indirectly heated tetrode thyratron, positive starter voltage, miniature 7-pin base
5729 – Beam-deflection, 30-channel analog multiplexer for telecomms transmitting channel banks, internal electrostatic focusing and deflection to determine through which one out of 30 grids the electron beam passes to the common anode. Cf. 5738, 6090, 6091, 6170, 6324
5731 – Narrow-tolerance selected 955 Acorn triode for use in Radiosonde weather balloon transmitters
5734 – Mechano-electronic displacement sensor; a vacuum triode with its anode mounted on a shaft that extends through a thin, flexible metal diaphragm; shaft movement is reflected in anode current; Fres = 12 kHz
5738 – Beam-deflection, secondary emission, 25-channel analog multiplexer, internal electrostatic focusing and deflection to determine which one out of 25 individually controllable dynodes receives the electron beam controlled by a common grid. Cf. 5729, 6090, 6091, 6170, 6324
5749– RF pentode; premium version of 6BA6, EF93, W727 
5750 – Heptode mixer; premium version of 6BE6, EK90, X727
5751 – Low-voltage, low-noise avionics dual triode with separate cathodes
5814A – Industrial, computer-rated version of 12AU7/ECC82
5836, 6BL6 – Sutton tube, a reflex klystron used as a 250 mW CW microwave source, 1.6 to 6.5 GHz depending upon an external cavity. 4-pin peewee base with cavity contact rings and top cap
5837, 6BM6 – Sutton tube used as a 150 mW CW microwave source, 550 MHz to 3.8 GHz depending upon an external cavity. 4-pin peewee base with cavity contact rings and top cap
5845 – Dual directly heated saturated-emission diode. Acts as a heating current-controlled, variable series resistor in voltage/current stabilizer circuits.
5876A – Glass pencil-type disk-seal UHF power triode up to 2 GHz
5930 – Ruggedized, directly heated power triode, 4-pin base
5962 – 700 V/2...55 μA Corona voltage reference, miniature 7-pin base with anode top cap
5963, 5964, 5965 – Dual triode, designed for high speed digital computers, has a high zero-bias anode current, industrial/computer-rated versions of 12AV7
5998, 6336A, 6394, 6520, 6528, 7802 – Dual power triodes, designed for series voltage regulator applications

6000s
6047 – Additron, a triple-control grid, split-anode tetrode for use as a single-bit digital full adder (technically a hexode)
6057, M8137 – High-mu dual triode; premium version of 12AX7, ECC83, B339
6059 – Low-microphonics pentode; premium version of 6BR7
6060, M8162 – High-mu dual triode; premium version of 12AT7, ECC81, B309
6064, M8083 – R.F. pentode; premium version of 6AM6, EF91, Z77
6067, M8136 – Medium-mu dual triode; premium version of 12AU7, ECC82, B329
6080 – Very-low impedance dual power triode, designed for series voltage regulator applications, now popular for output transformerless audio amplifiers; premium version of 6AS7
6082 – Ruggedized, indirectly heated power triode, octal base
6090 – Beam-deflection, 18-channel analog demultiplexer for telecomms receiving channel banks, internal electrostatic focusing and deflection to determine which one out of 18 anodes receives the electron beam controlled by a common grid. Cf. 5729, 5738, 6091, 6170, 6324
6091 – Beam-deflection, 25-channel analog multiplexer for telecomms transmitting channel banks, internal electrostatic focusing and deflection to determine through which one out of 25 grids the electron beam passes to the common anode. Cf. 5729, 5738, 6090, 6170, 6324
6146 – 60 MHz, 120 W AF/RF/VHF beam power pentode
6146B (8298A) – Improved version of 6146, 6146A and 8298.
6170 and 6324 – Beam-deflection, 25-channel analog multiplexer for telecomms transmitting channel banks, external focusing and deflection by a multiphase, rotating magnetic field to determine through which one out of 25 grids the electron beam passes to the common anode. Cf. 5729, 5738, 6090, 6091
6173 – Pencil-type disk-seal UHF diode up to 3.3 GHz
6196 – Directly heated dual, compensating electrometer tetrode with space charge grids for use in the 2 branches of a differential-in, differential-out bridge circuit
6218/E80T (CV5724) – Modulated, single-anode beam deflection tube for pulse generation up to 375 MHz; shock resistant up to 500 g
6263 – Pencil-type disk-seal UHF power triode up to 500 MHz, Panode = 8 W
6351 – Secondary emission pentode for wide band RF amplifiers
6353 – 19.3 kV/25...1000 μA Corona voltage reference, miniature 7-pin base with anode top cap
6361 – Convectron, an inclinometer tube that senses tilt from the vertical by means of different gas convections around a heating wire in a glass envelope, of two 6361s aligned in a 90° V-shaped position to each other and the heating wires connected in a bridge circuit
6391 – Subminiature low-microphonics pentode, 8-pin all-glass wire-ended
6441 – 650 V, 100 mAavg, 300 mAsurge Tacitron, a grid turn-off hydrogen thyratron with a grid that forms a shield around both the cathode and anode and separates the two by a wire mesh, so the arc discharge can be extinguished by a negative grid that surrounds the positive anode with a field of opposing polarity and inhibits conduction, taking over part of the anode current during deionisation – similar to today's GTOs; Octal base
6462 – Magnetic pickup tube, a 1-axis beam-deflection magnetometer with approx.  resolution; an electron beam is electrostatically centered between two anodes while no magnetic field is present; the magnetic field to be detected will then deflect the beam more towards one of the anodes, resulting in an imbalance between the two anode currents
6550 – 20 W AF beam tetrode for high fidelity amplifiers
6550A – Improved 6550 42 watt anode
6571 – Williams-type computer memory tube
6577 – Typotron, a charactron for text mode video rendering in early computer monitors
6700 – 200 ns Decade counter Magnetron Beam Switching Tube, 6.3 V, 300 mA heater
6701 – Low-voltage 500 ns decade counter Magnetron Beam Switching Tube, 6.3 V, 300 mA heater
6703 – 500 ns Decade counter Magnetron Beam Switching Tube, 6.3 V, 300 mA heater
6704 – 100 ns Decade counter Magnetron Beam Switching Tube with internal spade load resistors, 6.3 V, 300 mA heater
6710, 6711, 6712 (High current), 6714 (Low voltage) – 2 MHz Decade counter Beam-X Switch, 6.3 V heater
6762 – Wamoscope, a TWT/CRT combination used to directly visualize an incoming microwave signal by electron velocity-sorting
6835, 7570, 7571 – Single-electron gun recording storage tube, an analog video frame freezer tube. This was achieved by a CRT that writes the video image onto a thin, dielectric target and subsequently can read the generated charge pattern up to 30000 times from that target, producing a video signal containing a static shot that resembles a still photograph
6846 – Gas-filled, three-cathode 1-bit binary counter or switching tube, Miniature 7-pin base
6877, 7233 – Power triodes, designed for series voltage regulator applications
6900 – Dual power triode for pulse applications in missiles, avionics and industrial systems; noval base
6922 (E88CC, industrial version of 6DJ8/ECC88)
6973 – Power pentode similar in shape, size, and base to the EL84/6BQ5, but with a high gain for more than double the output range. Popular in some makes of 1960s era guitar amplifiers, though rarely implemented in modern times.

7000s
7025 – Low-hum, noise and microphonics version of 12AX7
7027 – AF Power pentode improved 6L6 with a 25 Watt anode and different pinout
7027A – Improved 7027 with a 35 watt anode
7077 – Miniature ceramic/metal disk-seal UHF triode
7105 – 12.6-volts version of 6080
7189/6BQ5/EL84 – AF Power pentode
7189A – Improved 7189
7199 – Triode-pentode, noval base. Similar to 6U8.
7229, 7230, 7231, 7232, 7439, 7440, 7441, 7595, 7596, 7597, 7598, 7599, 7600, 7602 – Krytrons, cold-cathode gas-filled trigger tubes with a primer electrode for use as a very high-speed, high-surge current switch – second source to EG&G
7236 – Dual power triode for use as long-life power amplifier in computer applications
7241, 7242 – Triple-cathode power triodes, designed for hi-rel cathode follower series voltage regulator applications where the cathode is split into 3 sections connected together via balancing resistors to equalize the emission along the cathode
7266 – Miniature ceramic/metal disk-seal UHF diode
7289 – 3 GHz, 40 W UHF planar power triode
7308/E188CC – Premium version of 6922
 – Beam deflection tube, used as balanced modulator/mixer up to 100 MHz
7414 – Time Totalizer, a metal-vapor coulometer, a cold-cathode gas-discharge tube where metal is constantly sputtered off the cathode and deposited on a collector element whose resistance therefore decreases with elapsed time
7430 – Flat-envelope version of the 6AK5/EF95 sharp-cutoff pentode for use on PCBs in Radiosonde weather balloon transmitters
7548 – Secondary emission hexode for pulse generator and pulse amplifier applications
7551 – Noval-base beam power pentode with 12-15 volt heater. 6.3 volt heater version was 7558. Used in telephony, RF amplification, and more rarely AF amplification. 
7554 – Ceramic/metal pencil-type disk-seal SHF power triode up to 5 GHz
7572, 7575, 7702 – Dual-electron gun recording storage tube, a realtime analog video frame freezer tube with simultaneous R/W, and storing capability. This was achieved by a CRT/camera tube combination; the CRT part writes the video signal onto a thin, dielectric target, which can hold the generated charge pattern for many hours; the camera part reads the charge pattern from the back side of this target, producing a video signal containing a static shot that resembles a still photograph
7586 – First Nuvistor available on the market, medium-mu triode
7587 – Nuvistor Sharp cutoff tetrode
7591 – Beam power pentode, octal base. Found in many guitar amps made by Gibson and Ampeg.
7688, 7690 (Medium-mu), 7689 (high-mu) – triple triodes
7699 – Dual tetrode for wide band push-pull amplifiers
7762 – Shock-proof avionics AF beam power pentode
7763 – Beam deflection tube, used as IF amplifier/limiter where a constant phase shift over a wide range of input signal amplitudes is required
7768 – Miniature ceramic/metal disk-seal planar SHF triode up to 4 GHz
7868 – Beam power pentode, B9E Novar base version of 7591. Found in many of the once popular Challenger series PA amps made by Bogen Communications, also found in some guitar amplifiers made by Ampeg.
7895 – Improved 7586 Nuvistor with higher mu

8000s
8011 – Micropup-type UHF power triode up to 600 MHz
8056 – Nuvistor triode for low supply voltage
8058 – Nuvistor triode with grid on envelope and an anode cap, for grounded-grid UHF circuits
8069 – 8 kV/23...1000 μA Corona voltage reference, cathode cylinder and anode top cap
8089 – 1.6 kV/20...800 μA Corona voltage reference, 2-pin all-glass wire-ended
8090 – 3.5 kV/50...1000 μA Corona voltage reference, Noval base with anode top cap
8091 – 4 kV/50...1000 μA Corona voltage reference, Noval base with anode top cap
8122 – Forced-air cooled, 300 W@470 MHz beam power tetrode
8256 – 3.5 kV/35...1900 μA Corona voltage reference, 2-pin all-glass wire-ended
8257 – 1.2 kV/15...750 μA Corona voltage reference, 2-pin all-glass wire-ended
8393 – Nuvistor Medium-mu triode, used in Tektronix oscilloscopes, 13.5 Volt heater
8469 – 400 V/5...400 μA Corona voltage reference, 2-pin all-glass wire-ended
8506 – Miniature ceramic/metal disk-seal planar UHF triode
8514 – 1 kV/10...800 μA Corona voltage reference, 7-pin with anode top cap
8515 – 1.6 kV/20...950 μA Corona voltage reference, 7-pin with anode top cap
8526 – Nuvistor-type medium-mu dual triode
8873 – 500 MHz, 200 W anode dissipation power triode
8874 – 500 MHz, 400 W anode dissipation power triode
8875 – 500 MHz, 300 W anode dissipation power triode
8877 = 3CX1500A7 – Ceramic, forced air cooled, 1.5 kW power triode
8974 (X-2159) – Giant water-cooled megawatt-class tetrode used for very high-power broadcast and industrial service; possibly the most powerful tube ever commercially produced

List of European Mullard–Philips tubes

List of Pro Electron professional tubes
Note: Typecode explained above.

X - Electro-optical devices

XA
XA1003 – Phototube, caesium-on-oxydated-silver cathode, 2-pin all-glass wire-ended

XG
XG2000 – Image converter for x-ray diagnostics

XL
XL7900 – Vibrating-capacitor chopper front end for dosimeters, electrometers, pH meters etc., Magnoval base with gold-plated pins

XM
XM1000 – Nimo tube, directly heated cathode-ray 1-digit numeric display tube, decimal points on both sides, hence 12 stenciled electron guns, top-viewing, green, 15 mm high Futura Medium font, oval envelope for easy horizontal stacking, 14-pin base

XP
XP1000 – 10-stage photomultiplier, blue-sensitive Sb-Cs cathode, Ag-Mg-O-Cs dynodes, diheptal (14-pin) base
XP1001 – 10-stage photomultiplier for gamma ray scintillation spectrometry, Sb-Cs cathode, Ag-Mg-O-Cs dynodes
XP1002 – 10-stage photomultiplier, blue/green/yellow/orange-sensitive Sb-Na-K-Cs cathode, Ag-Mg-O-Cs dynodes, diheptal base
XP1003 – 10-stage photomultiplier with quartz window, UV/blue/green/yellow/orange-sensitive Sb-Na-K-Cs cathode, Ag-Mg-O-Cs dynodes, diheptal base
XP1004 – 10-stage photomultiplier with quartz window, UV/blue-sensitive Sb-Cs cathode, Ag-Mg-O-Cs dynodes, diheptal base
XP1005 – 10-stage Ag-O-Cs (800±100 nm) photomultiplier, IR/red-sensitive Ag-O-Cs cathode, Ag-Mg-O-Cs dynodes, diheptal base
XP1010 – 10-stage photomultiplier for r-ray and gamma ray scintillation spectrometry, selected 150AVP for low noise and resolution, blue-sensitive Sb-Cs cathode, Ag-Mg-O-Cs dynodes, duodecal (12-pin) base
XP1011 – 10-stage photomultiplier, blue-sensitive Sb-Cs cathode, Ag-Mg-O-Cs dynodes, shock and vibration-proof, duodecal base
XP1020 – 12-stage photomultiplier, blue-sensitive Sb-Cs cathode, Ag-Mg-O-Cs dynodes, 100 Ω output, duodecal (20-pin) base
XP1021 – 12-stage photomultiplier, UV/blue-sensitive Sb-Cs cathode, Ag-Mg-O-Cs dynodes, 50 Ω output, duodecal base
XP1023 – 12-stage photomultiplier with quartz window Sb-Cs cathode, Ag-Mg-O-Cs dynodes, UV/blue-sensitive, 50 Ω output, duodecal base
XP1030 – 10-stage photomultiplier, blue-sensitive Sb-Cs cathode, Ag-Mg-O-Cs dynodes, diheptal (14-pin) base
XP1031 – 10-stage photomultiplier, blue-sensitive Sb-Cs cathode, Ag-Mg-O-Cs dynodes, for gamma ray scintillation spectrometry
XP1032 – 10-stage photomultiplier with 3 mm quartz window, UV/blue-sensitive Sb-Cs cathode, Ag-Mg-O-Cs dynodes, diheptal base
XP1033 – 10-stage photomultiplier with 10 mm quartz window, UV/blue-sensitive Sb-Cs cathode, Ag-Mg-O-Cs dynodes, diheptal base
XP1040 – 14-stage photomultiplier, blue-sensitive Sb-Cs cathode, Ag-Mg-O-Cs dynodes, concave window, duodecal base
XP1110 – Photomultiplier, blue-sensitive Sb-Cs cathode, Ag-Mg-O-Cs dynodes
XP1111 – Photomultiplier, blue-sensitive Sb-Cs cathode, Ag-Mg-O-Cs dynodes, wire-ends
XP1113 – 6-stage Photomultiplier, blue-sensitive Sb-Cs cathode, Ag-Mg-O-Cs dynodes
XP1114 – 4-stage Photomultiplier, blue-sensitive Sb-Cs cathode, Ag-Mg-O-Cs dynodes
XP1115 – Photomultiplier, blue-sensitive Sb-Cs cathode, Ag-Mg-O-Cs dynodes, wire-ends, shock and vibration-proof
XP1116 – Photomultiplier, red-sensitive Ag-O-Cs cathode, Ag-Mg-O-Cs dynodes, shock and vibration-proof
XP1117 – 9-stage photomultiplier, blue/green/yellow/orange-sensitive Sb-Na-K-Cs cathode, Ag-Mg-O-Cs dynodes
XP1118 – Photomultiplier with quartz window, UV/blue-sensitive Sb-Cs cathode, Ag-Mg-O-Cs dynodes
XP1120 – 17-stage photomultiplier for x-ray (λ > 200 pm) or UV (λ < 150 nm) photon counting in a high-vacuum environment, Nickel cathode, Cu-Be-O dynodes, coaxial outputs, built-in resistor ladder
XP1121 – 17-stage photomultiplier for ion (> 10 keV) or electron (0.1...10 keV) photon counting in a high-vacuum environment, Cu-Be-O cathode and dynodes, coaxial outputs, built-in resistor ladder
XP1122 – 17-stage photomultiplier for x-ray (λ > 200 pm) or UV (λ < 150 nm) photon counting in a high-vacuum environment, Nickel cathode, Cu-Be-O dynodes, coaxial outputs, built-in resistor ladder
XP1123 – 17-stage photomultiplier for ion (> 10 keV) or electron (0.1...10 keV) photon counting in a high-vacuum environment, Cu-Be-O cathode and dynodes, coaxial outputs, built-in resistor ladder
XP1130 – 17-stage photomultiplier for x-ray (λ > 200 pm) or UV (λ < 150 nm) photon counting in a high-vacuum environment, Nickel cathode, Cu-Be-O dynodes, coaxial outputs, built-in resistor ladder
XP1131 – 17-stage photomultiplier for ion (> 10 keV) or electron (0.1...10 keV) photon counting in a high-vacuum environment, Cu-Be-O cathode and dynodes, coaxial outputs, built-in resistor ladder
XP1140 – 6-stage photomultiplier, blue-sensitive Sb-Cs cathode, Ag-Mg-O-Cs dynodes, fast, diheptal base
XP1141 – 7-stage photomultiplier, blue-sensitive Sb-Cs cathode, Ag-Mg-O-Cs dynodes, fast, diheptal base
XP1180/52AVP – 10-stage photomultiplier, blue-sensitive Sb-Cs cathode, Ag-Mg-O-Cs dynodes, fast, diheptal base
XP1240 – Photomultiplier

XQ
XQ1023 – Camera tube
XQ1029R – Camera tube, red channel
XQ1032 – 1" Vidicon; magnetic focusing and deflection
XQ1053 – Camera tube
XQ1072 – 1" Plumbicon
XQ1073 – XQ1072 with higher resolution and improved low level contrast
XQ1200 – Vidicon, silicon target
XQ1270 – " Vidicon; Overall length 108mm (4")
XQ1272 – " Vidicon
XQ1274 – " Newvicon, magnetic focussing and deflection, ZnSe+CdZnTe target
XQ1275 – Vidicon, silicon target
XQ1276 – XQ1274 with high sensitivity into the near infrared
XQ1277 – XQ1275 with high sensitivity into the near infrared
XQ1278 – XQ1275 with better geometry and uniform signal
XQ1285 – 1" Vidicon; magnetic focusing and deflection, precision electron gun
XQ1290 – 1" Resistron camera tube
XQ1293 – Camera tube
XQ1300 – Saticon Camera Tube
XQ1340 – Low-light Vidicon
XQ1371 – Resistron
XQ1380 – XQ1274 with radiation resistant (anti-browning) faceplate
XQ1381 – " Newvicon; electrostatioc focusing and magnetic deflection with radiation-resistant (anti-browning) faceplate
XQ1395 – High-resolution Resistron camera tube
XQ1410B/G/R – Plumbicon for color TV broadcast
XQ1412 – 6/5" Plumbicon; low lag, unity gamma matched to P20 phosphor
XQ1413B/G/R – Plumbicon for color TV broadcast
XQ1415B/G/R – Plumbicon for color TV broadcast
XQ1427 – " Plumbicon; low lag
XQ1427B/G/R – Plumbicon for color TV broadcast
XQ1430B/G/R – Plumbicon for color TV broadcast
XQ1435B/G/R – Plumbicon for color TV broadcast
XQ1440 – 1" Newvicon, separate mesh, ZnSe+CdZnTe target
XQ1500B/G/R – Plumbicon for color TV broadcast
XQ1505B/G/R – Plumbicon for color TV broadcast
XQ1560 – 1" Saticon
XQ1565 – 1" Saticon
XQ1570 – 1" Saticon
XQ1575 – 1" Saticon
XQ1585 – 1" Saticon
XQ1600 – " Vidicon; separate mesh, electrostatic focusing and magnetic deflection
XQ1601 – " Newvicon; separate mesh, electrostatic focusing and magnetic deflection
XQ2070/02B/G/R – Plumbicon for color TV broadcast
XQ2070/05B/G/R – Plumbicon for color TV broadcast
XQ2075/02B/G/R – Plumbicon for color TV broadcast
XQ2075/05B/G/R – Plumbicon for color TV broadcast
XQ2172 – 1" Plumbicon; wide dynamic range matched to digital radiography applications
XQ2182 – 1" Plumbicon; wide dynamic range matched to digital radiography applications
XQ2427B/G/R – Plumbicon for color TV broadcast
XQ3070/02B/G/R – Plumbicon for color TV broadcast
XQ3070/05B/G/R – Plumbicon for color TV broadcast
XQ3075/02B/G/R – Plumbicon for color TV broadcast
XQ3075/05B/G/R – Plumbicon for color TV broadcast
XQ3427B/G/R – Plumbicon for color TV broadcast
XQ3430B/G/R – Plumbicon for color TV broadcast
XQ3435B/G/R – Plumbicon for color TV broadcast
XQ3440B/G/R – Plumbicon for color TV broadcast
XQ3445B/G/R – Plumbicon for color TV broadcast
XQ3457B/G/R – Plumbicon for color TV broadcast
XQ3467B/G/R – Plumbicon for color TV broadcast
XQ3477B/G/R – Plumbicon for color TV broadcast
XQ3487B/G/R – Plumbicon for color TV broadcast
XQ3550B/G/R – Plumbicon for color TV broadcast
XQ3555B/G/R – Plumbicon for color TV broadcast
XQ4187B/G/R – Plumbicon for color TV broadcast
XQ4502 – 2" Plumbicon; Highest resolution, low lag
XQ5002 – 2" Plumbicon; Electrostsatic deflection for improved corner resolution, low output capacitance
XQ7002 – 1" Plumbicon; Low output capacitance
XQ8002 – 1" Plumbicon
XQ9002 – 1" Plumbicon

XR

XR1000 – Monoscope, test pattern specified by suffix

XX
XX1000 – 2-stage image intensifier
XX1010 – Image intensifier
XX1020 – Image intensifier
XX1030 – Image intensifier
XX1050 – Image intensifier
XX1060 – Image intensifier
XX1066 – 1. Gen. 3-stage image intensifier
XX1140 – 1. Gen. 3-stage image intensifier
XX1190 – 1. Gen. inverter, 1-stage image intensifier
XX1192 – 1. Gen. inverter, 1-stage image intensifier
XX1200 – 1. Gen. inverter, 1-stage image intensifier
XX1211 – 1. Gen. inverter, 3-stage image intensifier
XX1270 – 1. Gen. inverter, 2-stage image intensifier
XX1400 – 2. Gen. inverter, 1-stage image intensifier
XX1430 – 1. Gen. inverter, 1-stage image intensifier
XX1510 – 1. Gen. 3-stage image intensifier
XX1610 – 2. Gen. image intensifier
XX1800 – 2. Gen. proximity focused, 1-stage image intensifier

Y - Vacuum tubes

YA
YA1000 – 5 kV, 5mA, Directly heated saturated-emission diode with pure-metal cathode for use in RMS converters of AC voltage/current stabilizer circuits, noval base

YD
YD1000 – 120 kW, Water-cooled RF power triode
YD1001 – 120 kW, Air-cooled RF power triode
YD1012 – 360 kW, Vapor-cooled RF power triode
YD1130 – 580 W, Air-cooled, linear RF/AF power triode
YD1252 (RS 2051 V) – 420 kW, Water-cooled, modulator power triode
YD1300 – 35 W, Air-cooled, UHF power triode
YD1301 – 50 W, Air-cooled, UHF power triode
YD1302 – 55 W, Air-cooled, UHF power triode
YD1332 – 250 W, Air-cooled, UHF power triode
YD1333 – 100 W, Air-cooled, UHF power triode
YD1334 – 110 W, Air-cooled, UHF power triode
YD1335 – 550 W, Air-cooled, UHF power triode
YD1336 – 220 W, Air-cooled, UHF power triode
YD1342 – 30 MHz, 530 kW, Water-cooled RF power triode
YD1352S (8867, DX334) – 5 MHz, 3 kW, Water-cooled Neotron, a gridless field-effect tube where a magnetically focused electron beam is modulated by varying the voltage of a gate electrode surrounding it. Used as RF power amplifier or oscillator

YG
YG1000 – Directly heated electrometer tetrode with an oxide cathode and a space charge grid, grid current ≤600 fA, magnoval base with input grid on top cap

YH
YH1000 – Traveling-wave tube
YH1050 – Traveling-wave tube
YH1110 – Traveling-wave tube
YH1120 – Traveling-wave tube, >5 GHz
YH1131 – Traveling-wave tube, >11 GHz
YH1150 – Traveling-wave tube
YH1160 – Traveling-wave tube, >3 GHz
YH1181 – Traveling-wave tube, >4 GHz
YH1190 – Traveling-wave tube, >11 GHz
YH1200 – Traveling-wave tube, >5 GHz

YJ
YJ1000 – Indirectly heated, 2.5 kW magnetron for use as a pulsed X-band oscillator between 9.19 and 9.32 GHz
YJ1462 – Indirectly heated, 28 kW coaxial magnetron for use as a pulsed X-band oscillator at 9.375 GHz

YK
YK1000 – Water-cooled, permanent-magnet 11 kW UHF linear-beam Klystron for use in TV transmitters between 400 and 620 MHz
YK1004 – Water-cooled, permanent-magnet 11 kW UHF linear-beam Klystron for use in TV transmitters between 610 and 790 MHz
YK1005 – Water-cooled, permanent-magnet 11 kW UHF linear-beam Klystron for use in TV transmitters between 470 and 860 MHz
YK1046 – 35 mW X-band Reflex Klystron, 9.16 to 9.34 GHz
YK1151 – Forced-air cooled, permanent-magnet 25 kW UHF linear-beam Klystron for use in TV transmitters between 470 and 860 MHz
YK1190 – Water-cooled 40 kW UHF linear-beam Klystron for use in TV transmitters between 470 and 610 MHz
YK1191 – Water-cooled 40 kW UHF linear-beam Klystron for use in TV transmitters between 590 and 720 MHz
YK1192 – Water-cooled 40 kW UHF linear-beam Klystron for use in TV transmitters between 710 and 860 MHz

YL
YL1000/8463 – RF power pentode
YL1020/8118 – See QQZ03/20
YL1030 – See QQZ06/40
YL1050 – UHF power tetrode
YL1060/7854 – See QQE06/40
YL1070/8117 – Dual RF power tetrode
YL1071 – YL1070 with a different heater
YL1080/8348 – Dual VHF power tetrode
YL1120 – RF power tetrode
YL1130/8408 – Dual VHF power pentode
YL1150/8579 – RF beam power tetrode
YL1190/8580 – Dual UHF power tetrode
YL1200 – See PE1/100
YL1210 – QQE03/12 with a different heater
YL1220 – QQE02/5 with a different heater
YL1240/8458 – Dual VHF power tetrode
YL1250/8505 – VHF beam power tetrode
YL1270/8581 – Dual UHF power tetrode
YL1290 – QE08/200 with a different heater
YL1310/8603 – RF beam power tetrode
YL1360 – QQE04/5 with a different heater
YL1570 (RS 1084 CJ) – VHF power tetrode

Z - Gas-filled tubes
Note: See also standard M-P tubes under Z

ZA
ZA1000 – Neon-filled, coaxial, tritium-primed (half-life: 12.32 years), sputtered-molybdenum cold-cathode switching diode, meshed cylinder anode, all-glass wire-ended
ZA1001 – Neon-filled, coaxial, tritium-primed, sputtered-molybdenum cold-cathode switching diode with traces of heavy gas (krypton/xenon) for slow de-ionization, e.g. for low-frequency relaxation oscillators; meshed cylinder anode, all-glass wire-ended
ZA1002 – Neon-filled, coaxial, tritium-primed, sputtered-molybdenum cold-cathode switching diode, large difference between burning and ignition voltage, meshed cylinder anode, 3-pin all-glass wire-ended
ZA1003 – Neon-filled, coaxial, tritium-primed, sputtered-molybdenum cold-cathode switching diode for use as indicator tube in transistorized circuits, meshed cylinder anode, 3-pin all-glass wire-ended
ZA1004 – Neon-filled, coaxial, tritium-primed, sputtered-molybdenum cold-cathode switching diode, small difference between burning and ignition voltage, for use as indicator tube in transistorized circuits or as 86.4 V Voltage reference, meshed cylinder anode, 3-pin all-glass wire-ended
ZA1005 – Neon-filled, coaxial, tritium-primed, sputtered-molybdenum cold-cathode switching diode for use like a DIAC in thyristor circuits, meshed cylinder anode, 2-pin all-glass wire-ended

ZC
ZC1010 (Z661W) – 8 mAavg, 50 mApeak, Gas-filled, cold-cathode AC trigger pentode, two starters and a primer electrode, positive starter voltage, 5-pin all-glass wire-ended, envelope inside radioactively coated for a constant ignition voltage, for use in bidirectional counters
ZC1040 – 25 mA, Gas-filled, cold-cathode AC trigger tetrode, one starter and a primer electrode, positive starter voltage, noval base
ZC1050 – 2 mA, Gas-filled, cold-cathode, luminescent trigger tetrode, one starter and a primer, 300 mlm light output for use as self-displaying shift register cells in large-format, crawling-text dot-matrix displays; all-glass wire-ended
ZC1060 – 20 mAavg, 5 kApeak, Gas-filled, cold-cathode, high-current trigger triode for e.g. capacitor discharge circuits. One external (capacitive) starter electrode

ZM
ZM1000 –  0 1 2 3 4 5 6 7 8 9  Neon-filled digital indicator tube, 14 mm character height side-viewing, left decimal point
ZM1000R – ZM1000 with a red contrast filter coating
ZM1001 –  + - ~   Neon-filled digital indicator tube, 14mmCH side-viewing, for use with ZM1000
ZM1001R – ZM1001 with a red contrast filter coating, for use with ZM1000R
ZM1002 –  ns μs ms s Hz kHz MHz  Neon-filled digital indicator tube, 13mmCH side viewing, for use with ZM1000 in digital frequency counters
ZM1003 –  1 - +  Neon-filled digital indicator tube, 14mmCH side-viewing, for use with ZM1000
ZM1005 –  0 1 2 3 4 5 6 7 8 9  Long-life neon-filled digital indicator tube, 14mmCH side-viewing, left decimal point, multiplex-capable
ZM1005R – ZM1005 with a red contrast filter coating
ZM1006 –  1 2 3 4 5 6  Neon-filled digital indicator tube, side-viewing, left and right decimal point, for use in TV receivers
ZM1008 –  0 1 2 3 4 5 6 7 8 9  Neon-filled digital indicator tube, 14mmCH side-viewing
ZM1010 –  0 1 2 3 4 5 6 7 8 9  Neon-filled digital indicator tube, 14mmCH side-viewing, left decimal point
ZM1012 –  0 1 2 3 4 5 6 7 8  Neon-filled digital indicator tube, 14mmCH side-viewing
ZM1015 –  0 1 2 3 4 5 6 7 8  Neon-filled digital indicator tube, 14mmCH side-viewing
 (Z520M) – ZM1022 with a red contrast filter coating
 (Z521M) – ZM1023 with a red contrast filter coating, for use with ZM1020
 –  0 1 2 3 4 5 6 7 8 9  Neon-filled digital indicator tube, 15.5mmCH top-viewing, no decimal point
ZM1023 –  A V Ω % + - ~  Neon-filled digital indicator tube, 15.5mmCH top-viewing, for use with ZM1022 in digital multimeters
ZM1024 – ZM1025 with a red contrast filter coating, for use with ZM1020
ZM1025 –   μs ms ns s  Neon-filled digital indicator tube, 15.5mmCH top-viewing, for use with ZM1022 in digital frequency counters
ZM1030 – ZM1032 with a red contrast filter coating
ZM1031 – ZM1031/01 without the  ~ 
ZM1031/01 – ZM1033/01 with a red contrast filter coating, for use with ZM1030
ZM1032 –  0 1 2 3 4 5 6 7 8 9  Neon-filled digital indicator tube, 15.5mmCH side-viewing, no decimal point, 5 dual cathodes and separate odd/even anode compartments for biquinary multiplexing
ZM1033/01 –  + - ~  Neon-filled digital indicator tube, 15.5mmCH side-viewing, separate anode compartment for  + , for use with ZM1032
 (Z522M) – ZM1042 with a red contrast filter coating
ZM1041 – ZM1043 with a red contrast filter coating, for use with ZM1040
ZM1041S – ZM1043S with a red contrast filter coating, for use with ZM1040
 (Z5220M) –  0 1 2 3 4 5 6 7 8 9  Neon-filled digital indicator tube, 30mmCH side-viewing, no decimal point
ZM1043 –  + -  Neon-filled digital indicator tube, 30mmCH side-viewing, for use with ZM1042
ZM1043S –  Y X + W U Z -  Neon-filled digital indicator tube, 30mmCH side-viewing, for use with ZM1042
ZM1047 – ZM1049 with a red contrast filter coating, for use with ZM1040
ZM1049 –  T F S N Z Y G H M X  Neon-filled digital indicator tube, side-viewing, for use with ZM1042 in numerical control systems
 (Z550M, 8453) – Neon-filled digital indicator tube, top-viewing, dekatron-type readout with common anode and common cathodes, pulsating anode voltage, controlled by 5-volts sensitive starter electrodes, for transistorized circuits
ZM1060 (Z505S) – Argon-filled, 50 kHz decade Counter/Selector Dekatron
ZM1070 (Z504S, 8433) – Neon-filled, 5 kHz decade Counter/Selector Dekatron
ZM1080 – ZM1082 with a red contrast filter coating
ZM1081 – ZM1083 with a red contrast filter coating, for use with ZM1080
ZM1082 –  0 1 2 3 4 5 6 7 8 9  Neon-filled digital indicator tube, 14mmCH side-viewing, no decimal point, probe electrode
ZM1083 –  + - ~  Neon-filled digital indicator tube, 14mmCH side-viewing, for use with ZM1082
ZM1100 –  0 1 2 3 4 5 6 7 8 9  Neon-filled digital indicator tube, 15.5mmCH top-viewing
ZM1120 – ZM1122 with a red contrast filter coating
ZM1122 –  0 1 2 3 4 5 6 7 8 9  Miniature neon-filled digital indicator tube, 7.8mmCH top-viewing
ZM1130 – ZM1132 with a red contrast filter coating
ZM1131 – ZM1133 with a red contrast filter coating, for use with ZM1080
ZM1132 –  0 1 2 3 4 5 6 7 8 9  Neon-filled digital indicator tube, side-viewing, left and right decimal point
ZM1133 –  + - ~  Neon-filled digital indicator tube, side-viewing, for use with ZM1132
ZM1136L/R – ZM1138L/R with a red contrast filter coating
ZM1137 – ZM1139 with a red contrast filter coating, for use with ZM1136L/R
ZM1138L/R –  0 1 2 3 4 5 6 7 8 9  Neon-filled digital indicator tube, 13mmCH side-viewing, left or right decimal points (specify)
ZM1139 –  + - ~ Ω  Neon-filled digital indicator tube, 13mmCH side-viewing, for use with ZM1138 in digital multimeters
ZM1162 –  0 1 2 3 4 5 6 7 8 9  Long-life neon-filled digital indicator tube, 15.5mmCH top-viewing, no decimal point, rectangular envelope for close stacking in both axes
ZM1170 – ZM1172 with a red contrast filter coating
ZM1172 –  0 1 2 3 4 5 6 7 8 9  Neon-filled digital indicator tube, 15.5mmCH side-viewing, no decimal point
ZM1174 – ZM1175 with a red contrast filter coating
ZM1175 –  0 1 2 3 4 5 6 7 8 9  Neon-filled digital indicator tube, 15.5mmCH side-viewing, left decimal point
ZM1176 – ZM1177 with a red contrast filter coating
ZM1177 – ZM1175, but right decimal point
ZM1180 – ZM1182 with a red contrast filter coating
ZM1181 – ZM1183 with a red contrast filter coating, for use with ZM1180
ZM1182 –  0 1 2 3 4 5 6 7 8 9  Neon-filled digital indicator tube, 16mmCH top-viewing, no decimal point, semi-rectangular envelope for close horizontal stacking
ZM1183 –  + - ~ Ω  Neon-filled digital indicator tube, top-viewing, 13mmCH for use with ZM1182 in digital multimeters
ZM1184D – ZM1185D with a red contrast filter coating
ZM1185A (GR1420) –  1 2 3 4 5 6 U K E R  Neon-filled digital indicator tube, 16mmCH top-viewing
ZM1185D (GR1430) –  ∇ Δ  Neon-filled digital indicator tube, 16mmCH top-viewing, for use in elevators
ZM1185E (GR1472) –  0 1 2 3 4 5 - t kg +  Neon-filled digital indicator tube, 16mmCH top-viewing
ZM1200 – Pandicon, multiplexed 14-digit display tube with decimal points and punctuation marks, pin connections on both ends
ZM1202 – 12-Digit Pandicon
ZM1204 – 10-Digit Pandicon
ZM1206 – 8-Digit Pandicon
ZM1210 – ZM1212 with a red contrast filter coating
ZM1212 –  0 1 2 3 4 5 6 7 8 9  Neon-filled digital indicator tube, 15.5mmCH side-viewing, left decimal point, all-glass wire-ended
ZM1220 – ZM1222 with a red contrast filter coating
ZM1222 –  0 1 2 3 4 5 6 7 8 9  Large neon-filled digital indicator tube, 40mmCH side-viewing
ZM1230 – ZM1232 with a red contrast filter coating
ZM1232 –  0 1 2 3 4 5 6 7 8 9  Neon-filled digital indicator tube, 15.5mmCH upside-down side-viewing, no decimal point
ZM1240 – ZM1242 with a red contrast filter coating
ZM1241 – ZM1243 with a red contrast filter coating, for use with ZM1240
ZM1242 –  0 1 2 3 4 5 6 7 8 9  Neon-filled digital indicator tube, 16mmCH side-viewing, right decimal point
ZM1243 –  + - ~ Ω  Neon-filled digital indicator tube, 16mmCH side-viewing, for use with ZM1242 in digital multimeters
ZM1263 –  ~ ⚫  Neon-filled digital indicator tube, 10mmCH side-viewing
ZM1290 – ZM1292 with a red contrast filter coating
ZM1292 –  0 1 2 3 4 5 6 7 8 9  Neon-filled digital indicator tube, 10mmCH side-viewing
ZM1330 – ZM1332 with a red contrast filter coating
ZM1331 – ZM1333 with a red contrast filter coating, for use with ZM1330
ZM1332 –  0 1 2 3 4 5 6 7 8 9  Neon-filled digital indicator tube, 13.1mmCH side-viewing, left and right decimal points, all-glass wire-ended
ZM1333 –  + - ~ Ω  Neon-filled digital indicator tube, 13.1mmCH side-viewing, all-glass wire-ended, for use with ZM1332 in digital multimeters
ZM1334 – ZM1336 with a red contrast filter coating
ZM1335 – ZM1337 with a red contrast filter coating, for use with ZM1334
ZM1336 –  0 1 2 3 4 5 6 7 8 9  Neon-filled digital indicator tube, 13.1mmCH side-viewing, left and right decimal points, multiplex-capable
ZM1337 –  + - ~ Ω  Neon-filled digital indicator tube, 13.0mmCH side-viewing, right decimal point (!), all-glass wire-ended, red contrast filter coating, for use with ZM1336 in digital multimeters
ZM1350 – Varisymbol, planar neon-filled digital 40mm x 27mm fourteen-segment display tube, right decimal point, separate underscore text cursor, keep-alive cathode, multiplex-capable, viewing angle 160°
ZM1360 – ZM1350 with 60mm x 40mm characters
ZM1370 – ZM1350 with 20mm x 13mm characters
ZM1410 – ZM1412 with a red contrast filter coating
ZM1412 – Neon-filled digital seven-segment display tube, 8.6mmCH side-viewing, right decimal point and left punctuation mark, all-glass wire-ended
ZM1500 – Pandicon, multiplexed 12-digit, 7-segment display tube
ZM1550 – Planar neon-filled digital two-digit seven-segment display tube, right decimal points
ZM1551 – Planar neon-filled digital 1-digit seven-segment display tube with  +  and  -  signs, right decimal points

Note: More Nixie tubes under standard - ZM and ETL examples

ZP
ZP1000 – Boron trifluoride-filled Geiger-Müller tube, thermal neutrons
ZP1010 – Boron trifluoride-filled Geiger-Müller tube, thermal neutrons
ZP1020 – Boron trifluoride-filled Geiger-Müller tube, thermal neutrons
ZP1070 – Subminiature Geiger-Müller tube, all-glass wire-ended
ZP1080 – Halogen-quenched Geiger-Müller tube, β and γ
ZP1100  – Halogen-quenched Geiger-Müller tube, γ; wire-ended
ZP1200 – Halogen-quenched Geiger-Müller tube, γ
ZP1300 – Halogen-quenched Geiger-Müller tube, γ and high-energy β
ZP1330 – Halogen-quenched Geiger-Müller tube, for use in damp and/or saline atmosphere, β and γ
ZP1400 – Halogen-quenched Geiger-Müller tube, 9mm diameter mica window, β and γ
ZP1430 – Halogen-quenched Geiger-Müller tube, 27.8mm diameter mica window, α, β, γ
ZP1490 – Halogen-quenched Geiger-Müller tube, 28mm diameter mica window, low-level α, β and γ
ZP1600 – Halogen-quenched Geiger-Müller tube, 19.8 mm diameter mica window, X-rays, 6.0 to 20 keV energy, 60 to 200 pm wavelength range
ZP1610 – Side window, organically quenched Geiger-Müller tube. 7 x 18 mm mica window; X-rays, 2.5 to 40 keV energy, 30 to 500 pm wavelength range
ZP1700 – Halogen-quenched, cosmic-ray guard counter tube for low-background measurements; to be used with another radiation counter tube in an anticoincidence circuit
ZP1800 – Halogen-quenched Geiger-Müller tube for use at temperatures up to 200 °C, γ
ZP1810 – Halogen-quenched Geiger-Müller tube for use at temperatures up to 200 °C, γ, low sensitivity, up to 40 mGy/h
ZP1860  – Halogen-quenched Geiger-Müller tube, β and γ

ZT
ZT1000 – 21 kV, 10 A Mercury vapor triode thyratron

ZX
ZX1000 – 800 V, 1140 Apk, 13Aavg Ignitron
ZX1051 – Water-cooled, 56 Aavg Ignitron
ZX1052 – Water-cooled, 140 Aavg Ignitron
ZX1053 – Water-cooled, 355 Aavg Ignitron
ZX1060 – Water-cooled, 10 Aavg Ignitron
ZX1061 – Water-cooled, 10 Aavg Ignitron
ZX1062 – Water-cooled, 10 Aavg Ignitron
ZX1063 – Water-cooled, 10 Aavg Ignitron

ZY
ZY1000 (872B) – High voltage, half-wave mercury-vapor rectifier
ZY1001/8008A – High voltage, half-wave mercury-vapor rectifier, 4-pin base with anode top cap
ZY1002 – High voltage, half-wave mercury-vapor rectifier, E40 (Goliath) Edison screw lamp base with anode top cap

ZZ
ZZ1000 – 81 V Voltage reference, 2-pin all-glass wire-ended
ZZ1010 – 85 V Voltage reference
ZZ1020 (STV85-8) – 82 V Voltage reference with primer electrode, 3-pin all-glass wire-ended
ZZ1030 (STV500-0,1) – Quad 125 V Voltage references, noval base
ZZ1031 – Quad Voltage reference, noval base
ZZ1040 (STV100-60Z) – 100 V Voltage reference with primer electrode
ZZ1050 – 82 V Voltage reference, 2-pin all-glass wire-ended

List of European transmitting tubes
Note: Typecode explained above.

B - Backward-wave amplifier

BA
BA9/20 – X-band, 20 mW, Forced-air cooled backward-wave oscillator

D - Rectifier incl. grid-controlled

DA
DA1.5/75 – 1.5 kV, 75 W Half-wave power rectifier, triode TA1.5/75 without grid
DA12/24000 – 12 kV, 24 kW Water-cooled half-wave power rectifier

DC
DC1/50 – 1 kV, 50 mA Full-wave power rectifier, DC1/60 with dual anode top cap
DC1/60 – 1 kV, 60 mA Full-wave power rectifier
DC2/200 – 2 kV, 200 mA Full-wave power rectifier with dual anode top cap

DCG
DCG1/125 – 1 kV, 125 mA Half-wave mercury-vapor rectifier with Edison screw lamp base and anode top cap
DCG12/30 – 12 kV, 30 A Grid-controlled, half-wave mercury-vapor rectifier with anode top cap

DCX
DCX4/1000 – 4 kV, 1 kW Half-wave xenon rectifier with anode top cap
DCX4/5000 – 4 kV, 5 kW Half-wave xenon rectifier with anode top cap

DE
DE2/200 – 2 kV, 200 W Full-wave power rectifier with dual anode top cap

J - Magnetron

JP
JP8/02B – 8.8 GHz, 25 W Magnetron
JP9/15 – 9.345 to 9.405 GHz, 15 kW Forced-air cooled magnetron for pulsed service

JPT
JPT9/01 – 9.15 to 9.60 GHz, 5 W Magnetron

K - Klystron

KB
KB9/150W – X-band, 150 W Water-cooled, dual-resonator klystron

KS
KS7/85 – 6.5 to 7.5 GHz, 85 mW Reflex klystron

L - Traveling-wave tube

LA
LA9/3 – 7 to 11.5 GHz Forward-wave amplifier
LA16/2 – 11.5 to 18 GHz Forward-wave amplifier

M - AF modulator Triode

MA
MA4/600 – 4 kV, 600 W Radiation-cooled triode

MB
MB1/50 – 1 kV, 50 W Radiation-cooled triode
MB2/200 – 2 kV, 200 W Radiation-cooled triode

MY
MY3/275 – 3 kV, 275 W Radiation-cooled triode

MZ
MZ2/200 – 2 kV, 200 W Radiation-cooled triode

P - Pentode

PA
PA12/15 – 15 kW Water-cooled shortwave pentode
PA12/20 – 20 kW Water-cooled pentode made by Philips and used in the 1930s and 1940s

PAL
PAL12/15 – Air-cooled version of PAW12/15

PAW
PAW12/15 – 15 kW Water-cooled shortwave pentode

PB
PB2/200 – 200 W Shortwave pentode
PB3/1000 – 1 kW Shortwave pentode

PC
PC03/3 – 3 W Shortwave pentode
PC3/1000 – 1 kW Shortwave pentode

PE
PE04/10 – 10 W Shortwave pentode
 (YL1200) – 100 W Shortwave pentode

Q - Tetrode

QB
QB2/75 – 75 W Beam-tetrode
QB5/2000 – 2 kW Beam-tetrode

QBL
QBL4/800 – Air-cooled 800 W beam-tetrode
QBL5/3500 – Air-cooled 3500 W beam-tetrode

QBW
QBW5/3500 – Water-cooled 3500 W beam-tetrode

QC
QC05/15 – 15 W Beam-tetrode
QC05/35 – 35 W Beam-tetrode

QE
QE04/10 – 10 W Beam-tetrode
QE05/40 (6146) – 40 W Radiation-cooled output beam-tetrode, popular amongst radio amateurs as a final RF amplifier
 – 200 W Beam-tetrode

QEL
QEL1/150 – Air-cooled 150 W beam-tetrode
QEL1/250 – Air-cooled 250 W beam-tetrode

QEP
QEP20/18 – 18 W Beam-tetrode for use as a pulse modulator

QQC
QQC03/14 – 14 W Dual beam-tetrode

QQE
 (6939) – 5 W Dual beam-tetrode
 (6360) – 12 W Dual beam-tetrode
QQE03/20 (6252) – 20 W Dual beam-tetrode
 (7377) – 5 W Dual beam-tetrode
 (5894, YL1060) – 40 W dual beam-tetrode, internally neutralized, Septar base with dual anode top cap

QQV
QQV02/6 – 6 W dual beam-tetrode
QQV03/20A – 20 W Radiation-cooled split-anode tetrode made by Mullard and used in the 1940s, 1950s and 1960s as a VHF frequency-doubling output stage with balanced output.
QQV07/50 – 50 W Dual beam-tetrode

QQZ
 (8118, YL1020) – 20 W Dual beam-tetrode
 (YL1030) – 40 W Dual beam-tetrode

QV
QV04/7 – 7 W Beam-tetrode
QV05/25 (807) – 25 W Radiation-cooled output beam-tetrode made by Mullard.
QV2/250C – 250 W Beam-tetrode

QY
QY3/65 – 65 W Beam-tetrode
QY5/3000A – 3 kW Beam-tetrode
QY5/3000W – Water-cooled version of QY5-3000A

QYS
QYS50/P40 – Pulsed power tetrode, Silica envelope, 50 kV anode voltage, considerable x-radiation, 810 °C anode temperature at 700 W anode dissipation, 40 A anode current at duty factor 0.0005, Vg1Cut-off (IA=1 mA@VA=55 kV): > -3.4 kV, gm: 38 mS

QZ
QZ06/20 – 25 W VHF Power tetrode up to 175 MHz

R - Rectifier incl. grid-controlled

RG
RG1000/3000 – 1 kV, 3 A Half-wave mercury-vapor rectifier with anode top cap

RGQ
RGQ7.5/0.6, RSQ7.5/0.6 (Grid-controlled) – 7.5 kV, 600 mA Half-wave mercury-vapor rectifier with anode top cap
RGQ20/5, RSQ15/40 (Grid-controlled) – 20 kV, 5 A Half-wave mercury-vapor rectifier with anode top cap

T - AF/RF/oscillator Triode

TA
TA04/5 – 400 V, 50 W Radiation-cooled power triode
TA1.5/75 – 1.5 kV, 75 W Radiation-cooled power triode
TA4/2000K – 4 kV, 2 kW Air-cooled power triode made by Philips in the 1930s
TA18/100000 – 18 kV, 100 kW Water-cooled power triode

TB
TB04/8 – Directly heated Doorknob VHF power triode up to 600 MHz
TB2.5/400 – 2.5 kV, 300 W Radiation-cooled power triode
TB5/2500 – 5 kV, 2.5 kW Radiation-cooled power triode

TBL
TBL2/300 – 2 kV, 300 W Forced air-cooled power triode
TBL15/125 – 15 kV, 125 kW Forced air-cooled power triode, 3-phase filament structure

TBW
TBW6/14 – 6 kV, 14 kW Water-cooled power triode
TBW15/125 – 15 kV, 125 kW Water-cooled power triode, 3-phase filament structure

TC
TC03/5 – RF power triode up to 85 MHz, 5 W
TC2/250 – RF power triode up to 20 MHz, 250 W

TD
TD03/5 – Indirectly heated disk-seal UHF power triode up to 2 GHz
TD03/10 – Indirectly heated disk-seal UHF power triode up to 2.8 W, 3.75 GHz
TD03/10F – TD03/10 with internal feedback for use as an oscillator
TD04/20 – Indirectly heated disk-seal UHF power triode up to 13.5 W, 1 GHz
TD1/100C = 2C39BA – Indirectly heated, ceramic disk-seal UHF power triode up to 24 W, 3.5 GHz
TD2/400 – Directly heated, ceramic disk-seal UHF power triode up to 600 W, 900 MHz
TD2/500 – Directly heated, ceramic disk-seal UHF power triode up to 500 W, 940 MHz

TE
TE05/10 – RF power triode up to 150 MHz

TX
TX12/12W – Water-cooled RF power triode
TX12/20W – Water-cooled RF power triode
TX10/4000 – Power triode, Silica envelope, 12 kV anode voltage, 4 kW anode dissipation, 1.6 A cathode current, gm: 4.5 mS, for use as self-excited high-power oscillator in induction heating equipment.

TY
TY2/125 – 135 W VHF power triode up to 200 MHz
TY12/50A – Forced-air cooled 45 kW RF power triode up to 30 MHz
TY12/50W – Water-cooled 50 kW RF power triode up to 30 MHz

TYS
TYS2/250 – Power triode, Silica envelope, 2.5 kV anode voltage, 250 W anode dissipation
TYS4/500 – Power triode, Silica envelope
TYS5/1000 – Power triode, Silica envelope
TYS5/2000 – Power triode, Silica envelope
TYS5/3000 – Power triode, Silica envelope, 6 kV anode voltage, 950 °C anode temperature at 3.5 kW anode dissipation, 2.8 A cathode current, gm: 15 mS. Used in RF generators for induction hardening.

X - Thyratron

XGQ
XGQ2/6400 – 2 kV, 6.4 kW Mercury-vapor tetrode thyratron with anode and grid1 top caps

XR
XR1/1600 (5545) – 1 kV, 1.6 kW Inert gas-filled triode thyratron with anode top cap
XR1/6400 – 1 kV, 6.4 kW Inert gas-filled triode thyratron with anode top cap

List of other number tubes

1
175HQ – Ultra high reliability pentode for use in long-haul submarine communications cable repeaters

1600s
1602 – Directly heated triode used for A.F. amplification with low microphonics. 7.5 volt heater/filament. 12 watts of A.F. operating in Class-A. 15 watts of low R.F. operating in Class-C. Similar to type 10.
1603 – Indirectly heated pentode used for A.F. amplification with low microphonics. Similar to types 6U7, 57, 6D6 and 6C6. UX6 Base.
1608 – Directly heated triode giving 20 watts at up to 45 MHz. 2.5 volt heater/filament. UX base.
1609 – Directly heated pentode used for A.F. amplification with low microphonics. American 5-Pin(UY)base.
1610 – Directly heated pentode specially designed for use as a crystal oscillator. 2.5 volt heater/filament, American 5-Pin base.
1612 – Pentagrid converter; low-microphonics version of type 6L7. Both control grids (1 and 3) are sharp-cutoff.
1619 – Beam Power Tetrode, similar to 6L6 with directly heated filament, common in World War II battle tank transmitters.
1624, 1625 – Very similar to the 807, but with different heater voltage
1626 – RF triode, very similar to 6J5 but with 12.6 volt filament
1629 – Tuning indicator tube with DC amplifier triode unit
1630 – Indirectly heated, orbital-beam, secondary-emission, 12-pin Jumbo Acorn-type UHF hexode
1633 – Dual triode, equivalent to 6SN7 with 25 volt heater (World War II aircraft use)
1635 – Indirectly heated, 10.4 W dual AF power triode, Octal base
1636 – Secondary emission UHF beam deflection tube, used as a balanced mixer up to 600 MHz
1650 – High-altitude version of the 955 Acorn-type triode
1680 – Dual-control heptode for use as a NAND gate in a coincidence circuit in IBM computers, 6BE6/EK90 with a sharp-cutoff grid no.3

2
24B1 – Trigatron
24B9 – Trigatron
29C1 – Directly heated saturated-emission diode; acts as a heating current-controlled, variable series resistor in voltage/current stabilizer circuits.

200s
203A – 40 W, Directly heated RF transmitter power triode, 4-pin base, anode on top cap
204A – 450 W, Directly heated RF transmitter power triode, 3-pin base, anode on top cap
205D – 14 W, Directly heated AF or modulator power triode, 4-pin base
207 – 22.5 kW, Water-cooled, directly heated RF transmitter power triode
210T – Directly heated RF transmitter power triode, 4-pin base, similar to type 10 triode with an isolantite base
210DET – Cossor directly heated, 2 volts, special detector
210HF – Cossor, directly heated, 2 volts, triode
210HL – Cossor, directly heated, 2 volts, triode
210LF – Cossor, directly heated, 2 volts, triode
210PG – Cossor, directly heated, 2 volts, variable-mu pentagrid
210RC – Cossor, directly heated, 2 volts, very high impedance triode
210SPT – Cossor, directly heated, 2 volts, HF pentode
210VPT – Cossor, directly heated, 2 volts, HF variable-mu shielded pentode
211 – 260 W, Directly heated AF or modulator power triode now favored by audiophiles; Jumbo 4-pin base
212E – 250 W, Directly heated RF transmitter power triode, 4-pin base
215P – Cossor, directly heated AF power triode
220B – 5 kW, Water-cooled, directly heated AF/modulator power triode
228 – 2.5 kW, Directly heated RF/AF power triode
230XP – Cossor, directly heated power triode
232C – 8.5 kW, Water-cooled, directly heated RF transmitter power triode
236A – 12 kW, Water-cooled, directly heated RF transmitter power triode
240B – Cossor, directly heated dual AF power triode
241B – 300 W, Directly heated AF/modulator power triode, 3-pin base, anode on top cap
242A – Directly heated AF/modulator power triode, 4-pin base
250TH – 1.1 kW, Directly heated AF/modulator power triode, 4-pin base, anode on top cap
254A – 14 W, Directly heated RF transmitter power triode, 4-pin base, anode on top cap
261A – 170 W, Directly heated AF/modulator power triode, 4-pin base
268A – 20 W, Directly heated power triode, 4-pin base, anode on top cap
270A – 350 W, Directly heated AF/RF power triode, 4-pin base, anode on top cap
275A – 3 W, Directly heated AF power triode, 4-pin base
276A – 170 W, Directly heated AF/RF power triode, 4-pin base
279A – 1.75 kW, Directly heated AF/RF power triode
295A – 125 W, Directly heated AF/RF power triode, 4-pin base
298A – 5 kW, Water-cooled, directly heated power triode

3

300s
300B – 40 watt directly heated power triode, 4-pin base
316A = VT191 – Directly heated Doorknob-type UHF power triode up to 750 MHz
322 – Oil can-type disk-seal UHF clipper power diode, 800 VPIV, 15 W, 1500 MHz
328 – Tungar bulb, a low-voltage, gas-filled, full wave rectifier for charging 12V lead-acid batteries at 1.3 A
368A – Directly heated Doorknob UHF power triode, graphite anode, up to 1.7 GHz
388A – Directly heated Doorknob UHF power triode, graphite anode, up to 1.7 GHz

4
4XP – Cossor, directly heated power triode
41MP – Cossor, indirectly heated power triode

400s
402P – Cossor, indirectly heated power triode, 7-pin base
416B – Planar SHF power triode, 500 mW output at 4 GHz
416D – Planar SHF power triode with BeO spacers, 5 W output at 4 GHz
446A – Early Lighthouse UHF triode, 10 dB noise figure at 1 GHz
450TH – Early Eimac high-mu power triode, 450 watt anode dissipation to 40 MHz
455A – Ultra high reliability pentode for use in submarine communications cable repeaters

4000s
Philips:
4065 – Directly heated electrometer triode, grid current ≤125 fA, 4-pin all-glass wire-end, for probe amplifiers
4613 – Directly heated power triode, 4-pin base
4614 – Indirectly heated power triode, 5-pin base
4641 – Directly heated power triode, 4-pin base
4671/E1C (955) – Indirectly heated Acorn triode
4672/E1F (954) – Indirectly heated Acorn pentode
4674 – Indirectly heated Acorn diode
4675 – 4671/E1C with a 4 Volts heater
4676 – 4672/E1F with a 4 Volts heater
4678 (EM1) – Indirectly heated tuning indicator
4683 – Directly heated power triode, side-contact 8 base
4695/E2F (956) – Indirectly heated Acorn pentode

RCA:
4042 – Ceramic/metal pencil-type disk-seal UHF power triode for pulsed operation up to 425 W
4062A – Ceramic/metal pencil-type disk-seal SHF power triode up to 4 GHz, mu = 100, Panode = 10 W
4560 – Character generator monoscope for text mode video rendering in early computer monitors, with a square target having letters, digits and symbols stenciled into it in a customer-supplied 8x8 array. An electron beam selects and scans a character, both by appropriate electrostatic deflection, and generates an analog video signal; cf. CK1414, TH9503
4598, 7539, 7828, 8087, 8098 – Graphechon dual-electron gun scan conversion tubes, analog video transcoders with simultaneous R/W capability for realtime resolution and frame rate transcoding between different analog video standards. This was achieved by a CRT/camera tube combination; the CRT part writes onto a thin, dielectric target; the camera part reads the generated charge pattern at a different scan rate from the back side of this target. The setup could also be used as a genlock

Standard Telephones and Cables:
4205E = 205E – Directly heated power triode, 4-pin bayonet base with offset pin
4270A = 270A = 3C/350E – Directly heated power triode, 3-pin base
4275A = 275A – Directly heated power triode, 4-pin base
4300A = 300A – Directly heated power triode, 4-pin base
4307A = 307A – Power pentode similar to the output beam-tetrode type 807. It differs from an 807 by being a directly heated pentode rather than an indirectly heated beam-tetrode. Both types are contained in an ST-16 bulb with an anode cap and 5-pin "American" UY base
The SY4307A is historically notable because a pair of them in parallel Class-C was used as the output stage in a transmitter built in secret by Australian soldiers in Japanese-occupied Portuguese Timor during World War II in 1942. This transmitter, now reconstructed and on display at the Australian War Memorial in Canberra, was called "Winnie the War Winner".
4307AF – 4307A qualified for use in standard aircraft radio

5
5BP4 – Five-inch CRT used in pre-World War II television receivers, such as the RCA TRK-5 and in early radars such as the SCR-268 and SCR-270.
5CEP11 (blue, short persistence); 10VP15, 5AKP15, 5DKP15, 5ZP15 (blue-green, extremely short); 5BNP16, 5CEP16, 5DKP16, 5ZP16 (violet/near-ultraviolet, very short); 5AKP24, 5AUP24, 5DKP24, 5ZP24 (green, short); 131QP55 (blue-green, very short); 131QP56 (blue-violet, very short) – CRT-type flying-spot scanners for use in a telecine

500s
527 – High-mu power triode up to 900 W
559 – Lighthouse-type disk-seal UHF diode
592 = 3-200A3 – Medium-mu power triode up to 200 W, 150 MHz

6
6P10 – Ultra high reliability pentode for use in short-haul submarine communications cable repeaters
6P12 – Ultra high reliability pentode for use in long-haul submarine communications cable repeaters

7
7JP1 – Monochrome cathode ray tube for use in early postwar oscilloscopes. Electrostatic deflection, P1 green, short-persistence phosphor,  screen.
7JP4 – Monochrome cathode ray tube common in early postwar TV receivers. Electrostatic deflection, P4 white, medium-persistence phosphor,  screen.
7JP7 – Monochrome cathode ray tube for use in early postwar radar displays. Electrostatic deflection, P7 blue-white, long-persistence phosphor,  screen.

700s
703A – Directly heated Doorknob UHF power triode up to 1.5 GHz
713A – Indirectly heated Little Doorknob UHF pentode, Bakelite Octal base
717A (CV3594, VT269) – 713A with a metal shield and a low loss mica-filled phenolic resin Octal base

8

800s
800 – Directly heated V.H.F. power triode, giving 35 watts up to 60 MHz and 18 watts at 180 MHz. American 4-Pin(UX)base with side locating pin.
801 – Directly heated power triode, used in pairs in Class-B in A.M. modulation sections of transmitters giving up to 45 watts of power at 60 MHz and 22 watts at 120 MHz.
802 – Indirectly heated H.F. power pentode, giving 8 watts up to 30 MHz and 4 watts at 110 MHz.
803 – Directly heated H.F. power pentode, giving 50 watts up to 20 MHz and 25 watts at 70 MHz.
804 – Directly heated H.F. power pentode, giving 20 watts up to 15 MHz and 10 watts at 10 MHz.
805 – Directly heated H.F. high-mu triode, giving 140 watts up to 30 MHz and 70 watts at 85 MHz.
806 – Directly heated H.F. high-mu triode, giving 390 watts up to 30 MHz 195 watts at 100 MHz.
807 – Indirectly heated H.F. beam power tetrode, giving 25 watts up to 30 MHz and 12 watts at 125 MHz. A variation of type 6L6 originally designed as a Class-C transmitter tube. Later used in pairs as push-pull outputs for high-wattage Class-AB2 audio amplifiers. Also used as a horizontal output tube in early TV receivers. One of the first commercial tubes that used the top cap to connect the anode (instead of the control grid) to the circuit.
808 – Directly heated H.F. high-mu triode, giving 140 watts up to 30 MHz and 70 watts at 130 MHz.
809 – Directly heated H.F. high-mu triode, giving 55 watts up to 27 MHz and 30 watts at 100 MHz.
810 – Directly heated H.F. triode, 10 volt filament and Zirconium Carbide anode. Base fits R.C.A. UT-541A Socket.
811A – Directly heated H.F. triode, 6.3 volt filament, 88 watts
813 – Beam Power Tetrode possessing about 5 times the Anode dissipation of an 807.
814 – A directly heated Beam Power Tetrode giving about 130 watts at 30 MHz and 65 watts at 100 MHz operating in Class-C.
815 – An indirectly heated dual Pentode. Octal base.
825 – First commercially available klystrode, a VHF/UHF linear-beam transmitting tube, similar to a klystron
829 – A dual indirectly heated beam power tetrode. Two 6.3 volt heaters sharing a common tap.
830 – A directly heated triode giving about 50 watts at 15 MHz and 7.5 watts at 60 MHz operating in Class-C.
831 – A directly heated triode giving about 400 watts at 20 MHz and 200 watts at 60 MHz operating in Class-C. 11 volt heater/filament.
833 – A larger directly heated high-mu triode giving about 1 kW at 30 MHz and 500 watts at 45 MHz operating in Class-C. Usable up to 100 MHz at reduced power, (400 W). 10 volt heater/filament drawing 10 A. The anode of this device is fabricated from tantalum. Anode current of 800 mA with an anode voltage of 3 kV and grid voltage of zero. Anode current of 4.3 A at a voltage of 750 with 350 volt on the grid. Uses two-part R.C.A socket assembly UT-103.
833A – Improved 833.
834 – A directly heated triode giving 58 watts at 100 MHz and 25 watts at 350 MHz operating in Class-C. 7.5 volt heater/filament. Fitted with an American 4-Pin, (UX4), base with side locating pin.
836 – An indirectly heated high vacuum rectifier with a peak inverse voltage of 5 kV and peak anode current of 1 ampere. 2.5 volt heater.
837 – An indirectly heated pentode giving 11 watts at 20 MHz and 5 watts at 80 MHz. operating in Class-C. 12.6 volt heater.
838 – A directly heated triode giving about 100 watts at 30 MHz operating in Class-C. 10 volt heater/filament.
841 – A directly heated high-mu triode giving about 10 watts at 6 MHz and 5 watts at 170 MHz operating in Class-C. 7.5 volt heater/filament.
842 – A directly heated triode giving about 3 watts at 6 MHz operating in Class-C. 7.5 volt heater/filament.
843 – An indirectly heated tetrode giving gain at 6 MHz and usable up to 200 MHz operating in Class-C. 2.5 volt heater/filament.
844 – A directly heated triode giving gain at 6 MHz and usable up to 155 MHz operating in Class-C. 2.5 volt heater/filament.
845 – A directly heated triode giving up to 24 watts of undistorted power in Class-A at audio frequency with an anode voltage of 1250. 10 volt heater/filament.
849 – A directly heated triode giving gain at 3 MHz operating in Class-C. Two 849s, working in push-pull Class-B are capable of delivering 1.1 kW of audio output with an anode voltage of 3 kV. Usable up to 30 MHz. 11 volt filament/heater.
850 – A directly heated tetrode giving 120 watts of power gain up to 13 MHz and 50 watts at 100 MHz, operating in Class-C. 10 volt heater/filament.
851 – A directly heated triode giving 1.5 kW of power up to 3 MHz operating in Class-C. 11 volt heater/filament.
852 – A directly heated triode giving 75 W of power up to 30 MHz operating in Class-C. 10 volt heater/filament.
857B – Large mercury-vapor rectifier used in 50 kW class broadcast transmitters. 22 kV anode voltage, 10 A anode current. Filament 5 V @ 30 A
860 – A directly heated tetrode giving 105 W of power up to 30 MHz and 50 watts at 120 MHz operating in Class-C. 10 volt heater/filament.
861 – A directly heated triode giving 400 W of power up to 20 MHz and 200 watts at 60 MHz operating in Class-C. 11 volt heater/filament.
862 – Large water-cooled triode for broadcast/industrial applications. Used in experimental 500 kW transmitter at WLW.
864 – A directly heated general-purpose, low-microphonics triode with a maximum anode voltage of 135 volts and anode current of 3.5 mA. 1.1 volt heater/filament.
865 – A directly heated tetrode giving 30 W of power up to 15 MHz 15 watts at 70 MHz operating in Class-C. 7.5 volt heater/filament.
866 – A mercury-vapor rectifier with a peak inverse voltage of 5 kV and peak anode current of 1 ampere. Average anode current, 250 mA, forward drop, 15 volt. Heater voltage and current, 2.5 at 5 A. American 4-Pin(UX) base.
866A – Improved 866 with a peak inverse voltage of 10 kV and a forward drop of 10 volt.
 – A mercury-vapor rectifier with a peak inverse voltage of 5 kV and peak anode current of 5 amperes. Average anode current, 1250 mA, forward drop, 15 volt. Heater voltage, 5.0 at 10 A. Base fits R.C.A. UT-541A Socket.
872A – Improved 872 with a peak inverse voltage of 10 kV, a forward drop of 10 volt and a heater current of 6.25 A.
879 – A high vacuum rectifier with a peak inverse voltage of ca. 15 kV and peak anode current of ca. 5 mA. 2.5 volt heater and American 4-Pin, (UX) base. Used as half wave rectifier for high voltage cathode ray tube supplies. Similar to type 2X2.
884 – An indirectly heated triode thyratron. 6.3 volt heater/filament, Octal base. Electrically similar to type 885. Once commonly used as a sawtooth horizontal sweep waveform generator in recurrent-sweep oscilloscopes. Marketed by DuMont under the type number 6Q5.
885 – An indirectly heated triode thyratron. 2.5 volt heater/filament, American 5-Pin (UY) base. Otherwise similar to type 884.
898 – Large water-cooled triode for broadcast/industrial applications. Updated version of 862, with 3-phase filament structure.

9

900s
934 – Vacuum Phototube, spectral S4 response (maximum sensitivity at 400±50 nm), 3-pin Small-Shell Peewee base
935 – Vacuum Phototube, spectral S5 response (maximum sensitivity at 340±50 nm), 4-pin octal base
950 – Power pentode with directly heated cathode, used in storage battery home radios with 2.0 volt filament supply. Similar to types 1F4 and 1J5G
951 – Sharp-cutoff pentode with directly heated cathode, used in storage battery home radios with 2.0 volt filament supply. Similar to type 1B4P
953 – Acorn-type UHF diode; 6.3 V heater
954 (4672/E1F) – Indirectly heated Acorn-type sharp-cutoff pentode giving gains of 2...3 up to 300 MHz operating in Class-A and usable up to 600 MHz with careful stage design; 6.3 V heater
955 (4671/E1C) – Indirectly heated Acorn-type triode giving a power of 135 mW up to 600 MHz operating in Class-A and 500 mW in Class-C with careful stage design; 6.3 V heater
956 (4695/E2F) – Indirectly heated Acorn-type remote-cutoff pentode giving gains of 3...4 up to 600 MHz operating in Class-A with careful stage design; 6.3 V heater
957 (D1C) – Directly heated Acorn-type UHF receiving triode; 1.25 V filament for portable equipment
958 (D2C) – Directly heated Acorn-type UHF transmitting triode with dual, paralleled 1.25 V filaments for increased emission, for portable equipment
958A – 958 with tightened emission specs
959 (D3F) – Directly heated Acorn-type sharp-cutoff UHF pentode; 1.25 V filament for portable equipment
991 – 60-Volts Voltage reference, T4 lightbulb with 2-contact, bayonet candelabra mount

9000s
9001 – 954 with a miniature 7-pin base
9002 – 955 with a miniature 7-pin base
9003 – 956 with a miniature 7-pin base
9004 – Acorn UHF diode
9005 – Acorn UHF diode with a 3.6 V heater
9006 – Detector diode with a miniature 7-pin base

List of other letter tubes

A
Edison and Swan Electric Light Company (British Mazda/EdiSwan):
A40 – Acorn UHF triode up to 600 MHz, 4 Volts heater
A41 – Acorn UHF pentode up to 600 MHz, 4 Volts heater

AC*/
Mazda/EdiSwan 4-volts AC, indirectly heated receiver tubes:
AC/HL – AF triode, British 5-pin base
AC/HLDD = TDD4 = MHD4 – Dual diode and AF triode, British 7-pin base
AC/ME – Tuning indicator, British 7-pin base
AC/P, AC/P1 – AF triode, British 5-pin base
AC/P4 – CRT electrostatic-deflection output power triode, British 5-pin base
AC/PEN – AF power pentode, British 7-pin base
AC/S2PEN – RF pentode, British 7-pin base
AC/SP1 – RF pentode for use in squelch circuits or, as the reactance tube, in AFC circuits, British 7-pin base
AC/SP3 – RF pentode for shortwave and TV receivers, British 7-pin base
AC/SP3/RH – Low-noise, low-microphonics RF pentode for shortwave and TV receivers, British 7-pin base
AC/TH1 – Triode/hexode oscillator/mixer, British 9-pin base
AC/TP = TP4 – Triode/pentode oscillator/mixer, British 7-pin base
AC/VP1, AC/VP2 – RF pentode, British 7-pin base
AC2/HL – High-mu triode
AC2/PEN – AF Power pentode
AC2/PEN.DD – Dual diode and AF Power pentode
AC4/PEN – AF Beam power pentode
AC5/PEN – AF Beam power pentode
AC5/PEN.DD – Dual diode and AF Beam power pentode
AC6/PEN – Beam power pentode for use as a magnetic horizontal-deflection output amplifier

ACT
Marconi-Osram Valve Company
ACT9 – 800 W Air cooled transmitting triode up to 15 MHz, with derating up to 80 MHz

B

BA
Industrial Electronic Engineers:
BA-0000-P31 – Nimo tube, cathode-ray 1-digit numeric display tube, 10 stenciled electron guns aiming at a P31-phosphor (yellowish-green, medium-persistence) fluorescent screen, top-viewing, Futura Medium font, 2.5 kV anode voltage, 12-pin base

BG
Burroughs Neon-filled planar glow-transfer plasma bar graph displays:
BG08220-K – 120-Segment circular with five cathode strings plus a Reset cathode, 1-in-5 major/minor graduation, for use e.g. in direction-finding equipment
BG12201 = Dale PBG12201 – Dual 201-segment linear with three cathode strings plus a Reset cathode, for use in VU meters etc.
BG12203 = PBG12203 – Dual 203-segment linear bidirectional with three cathode strings plus two Reset cathodes
BG12205 = PBG12205 – Dual 201-segment linear with five cathode strings plus a Reset cathode, for use in VU meters etc.
BG16101 = PBG16101 – Dual 101-segment linear with three cathode strings plus a Reset cathode, for use in VU meters etc.; cf. ИН-33

BT
British Thomson-Houston (General Electric subsidiary):
BT1 – Thyratron used in Wynn-Williams' binary prescaler for the alpha particle counter that Rutherford, Chadwick et al. used for their nuclear research at the Cavendish Laboratory in the 1930s

C

CH
Tung-Sol:
CH1027 – Curristor – Four types of nitrogen-filled, radioactive constant-current tubes with a current plateau from 25 to 500 V, all-glass wire-ended, active material is 226Ra with a half-life of 1601 years, for linear capacitor charging and draining in missile and ordnance mine timing circuits, instrumentation biasing, as current reference, etc.:
CH1027-9 – 10−9 A, 
CH1027-10 – 10−10 A, 
CH1027-11 – 10−11 A, 
CH1027-12 – 10−12 A,

CK
Raytheon:

CK1022 – 1 kV/5...55 μA Corona voltage reference, miniature 7-pin base with anode top cap
CK1037 = 6437 – 700 V/5...125 μA Corona voltage reference, 3-pin all-glass wire-ended
CK1038 – 900 V/5...55 μA Corona voltage reference, 3-pin all-glass wire-ended
CK1039 = 6438 – 1.2 kV/5...125 μA Corona voltage reference, 3-pin all-glass wire-ended
CK1366, CK1367, CK1368, CK1369 – CRTs with an unphosphored front glass but with fine wires embedded in it for use as electrostatic print heads; the wires would pass the electron beam current through the glass onto a sheet of paper where the desired content was therefore deposited as an electrical charge pattern. The paper was then passed near a pool of liquid ink with the opposite charge. The charged areas of the paper attract the ink and thus form the image.
CK1383 – Dual-electron gun recording storage tube, a realtime polar, radar PPI-to-rectangular, TV-type analog video transcoder similar to the 7702, with simultaneous R/W, and storing capability. This was achieved by a CRT/camera tube combination; the CRT part writes the PPI-format image onto a thin, dielectric target; the camera part reads the generated charge pattern in TV format from the back side of this target.
CK1414 – Symbolray character generator monoscope for text mode video rendering in early computer monitors, with a square target having letters, digits and symbols patterned on it in a customer-supplied 8x8 or 8x12 array. An electron beam selects and scans a character, both by appropriate electrostatic deflection, and generates an analog video signal; cf. 4560, TH9503

CL
Ferranti:
CL40 and CL41 – Indirectly heated, linear light source (glow modulator tube), mercury/argon-filled gas diode with primer electrode, Octal base, for rotating-drum FAX receivers, film soundtrack recording, etc.
CL42 and CL43 – Indirectly heated, low-noise linear light source, helium-filled gas diode with primer electrode, Octal base, for film soundtrack recording, interferometers, etc.
CL44 – Indirectly heated, low-noise linear light source, neon-filled gas diode with primer electrode, Octal base
CL50 and CL52 – Indirectly heated, linear light source, gas-filled diode with primer electrode, Miniature 7-pin base, for rotating-drum FAX receivers, film soundtrack recording, etc.
CL55 – Indirectly heated, spectrally pure light source, helium-filled gas diode with primer electrode, Miniature 7-pin base with anode top cap
CL56 – Indirectly heated, spectrally pure light source, krypton-filled gas diode with primer electrode, Miniature 7-pin base with anode top cap
CL57 – Indirectly heated, spectrally pure light source, neon-filled gas diode with primer electrode, Miniature 7-pin base with anode top cap
CL58 – Indirectly heated, spectrally pure light source, xenon-filled gas diode with primer electrode, Miniature 7-pin base with anode top cap
CL60 – Indirectly heated triode flood beam CRT-type stroboscope lamp with a green A-type phosphor with <1 μs decay time and 10 kCd light output, 20 kV anode voltage, 7-pin duodecal base
CL61 – CL60 with a blue P-type phosphor with 5 μs decay time and 16 kCd light output
CL62 – CL60 with an UV Q-type phosphor with 100 ns decay time and 240 Cd light output
CL63 – CL60 with a yellow-green C-type phosphor with 6 μs decay time and 24 kCd light output
CL64 – CL60 with a yellow V-type phosphor with 5 μs decay time and 12 kCd light output
CL65 – CL60 with a red R-type phosphor with 2 μs decay time and 14 kCd light output
CL66 – CL60 with a white T-type phosphor with 5 μs decay time and 12 kCd light output

D
Philips:
D1 – Early directly heated triode used in 1920s TRF and regenerative radios

DDR
Mullard:
DDR100 – 100 g max., 250 Hz max., 1-axis accelerometer dual diode with elastically supported anodes, 6.3V/600mA indirect heater, fres = 1 kHz, B8G base

DZ
Cerberus:
DZ10 – 3 kHz max. Decade Counter/Selector Dekatron, 14-pin diheptal base

E

EN
Ferranti:
EN10 – Neostron, 400 Apk Gas-filled, cold-cathode tetrode thyratron, differential trigger electrodes, Octal base, for use as a relay or as a reddish 700 Cd stroboscope lamp
EN15 – 80 Aavg Neon-filled, cold-cathode tetrode thyratron, differential trigger electrodes, Noval base, for use as a stroboscope lamp
EN30 – 250 Apk Gas-filled, arc-discharge cold-cathode tetrode thyratron, differential trigger electrodes, miniature 7-pin base with anode cap, for use as a relay or as a stroboscope lamp
EN40 – 250 Apk Gas-filled, cold-cathode tetrode thyratron, differential trigger electrodes, Octal base, for use as a whitish stroboscope lamp with a high actinism for photographic film
EN55 (Single), EDN10 (dual) – Xenon-filled, arc-discharge cold-cathode tetrode thyratron, external (capacitive) trigger, 12-pin base, for use as a white 140 kCd stroboscope lamp
EN60 – Gas-filled, arc-discharge cold-cathode tetrode thyratron, external (capacitive) trigger, Edison screw lamp base with anode cap, for use as a white 900 klm@10μF@800V stroboscope lamp

G
Standard Telephones and Cables/Brimar:
G10/241E – Nomotron, a unidirectional Dekatron with multi-alloy cathodes

Cerberus:
G11 – 5 mA Gas-filled, cold-cathode switching diode e.g. for relaxation oscillators, 2-pin all-glass wire-ended
G42 – 35 mApeak Gas-filled switching diode e.g. for relaxation oscillators, 2-pin all-glass wire-ended

GE
Ferranti:
GE10 – Directly heated saturated-emission diode. Acts as a heating current-controlled, variable series resistor in voltage/current stabilizer circuits. It has two shorted pins that can be used to disable the circuit if the tube is removed from its socket

GK
Cerberus:
GK11 – Touch button tube, an illuminated capacitance touch switch; a cold-cathode DC relay tube, external (capacitive) starter activated by touching; then the cathode glow is visible as an orange ring. 2-pin all-glass wire-ended

GN
Ferranti:
GN10 – 250 Amps pulse-current, cold-cathode tetrode thyratron. Octal base

GR

Cerberus:
GR15 – 15 mA Gas-filled cold-cathode DC tetrode, one starter and one electrical primer and tritium-primed (half-life: 12.32 years), noval base, for voltage triggers, RC timers etc.
GR16 – 20 mA Gas-filled, cold-cathode, tritium-primed AC/DC triode, one starter and an EM shield, noval base, for voltage triggers, RC timers etc.
GR17 – 15 mA Gas-filled cold-cathode AC triode, one starter and an EM shield, noval base, for voltage triggers, RC timers etc.
GR31 – 15 mA Gas-filled cold-cathode DC tetrode, one starter and one electrical primer plus a tritium primer, noval base
GR44 – 12 mA Subminiature gas-filled cold-cathode DC pentode, two starters and one primer electrode plus a tritium primer, 5-pin all-glass wire-ended
GR46 – 12 mA Subminiature gas-filled cold-cathode DC tetrode, one starter and one primer electrode, 4-pin all-glass wire-ended

GRD
Ferranti:
GRD7 – Educational, directly heated saturated-emission guard ring diode

K

KN

Edgerton, Germeshausen, and Grier:
KN2 – 4 kV, 500 Asurge Krytron, a cold-cathode gas-filled tube with a primer electrode, for use as a very high-speed, high-surge current switch; similar to a thyratron, lifespan 107 shots, 4-pin all-glass wire-ended
KN4 – 5 kV, 2.5 kAsurge Krytron with a primer electrode, lifespan 25000 shots, 4-pin all-glass wire-ended
KN6 – 5 kV, 3 kAsurge Krytron with a primer electrode, lifespan 35000 shots, 4-pin all-glass wire-ended
KN6B – 8 kV, 3 kAsurge Krytron with a primer electrode, lifespan 35000 shots, 4-pin all-glass wire-ended
KN9 – 4 kV, 500 Asurge Krytron with a primer electrode, lifespan 1.5×107 shots, 4-pin all-glass wire-ended
KN11B – 2.5 kV, 1.5 kAsurge Sprytron, lifespan 2000 shots, 3-pin all-glass wire-ended
KN12 – 5 kV, 3 kAsurge Sprytron, lifespan 500 shots, 3-pin all-glass wire-ended
KN22 – 5 kV, 100 Asurge Krytron with a primer electrode, lifespan 2×107 shots, 4-pin all-glass wire-ended, for laser pumping, to drive Pockels cells, also for educational purposes
KN26 – 5 kV, 3 kAsurge Krytron with a primer electrode, lifespan 75000 shots, 4-pin all-glass wire-ended

KT
"Tung-Sol":
KT90
KT120 – New production tube
KT150 – New production tube
KT170 – New production tube

M

MC
Philips:
MC6-16, MC13-16 – CRT-type flying-spot scanners, P16-type phosphor (violet/near-ultraviolet, very short persistence), for use in a telecine

ME
Edison and Swan Electric Light Company (British Mazda/EdiSwan):
ME91 – AC/DC mains tuning indicator

P

PD
Edison and Swan Electric Light Company (British Mazda/EdiSwan):
PD220 – Dual AF power triode for battery-supplied equipment (1939)

PL
Philips:
PL21 = 2D21 = EN91 – 100 mAavg, 500 mApeak, 10 Asurge, Gas-filled, indirectly heated tetrode thyratron, negative starter voltage, miniature 7-pin base, for relay and grid-controlled rectifier service
PL323 = 3C23 – 1.5 Aavg, 6 Apeak, Mercury-vapor triode thyratron, 4-pin base with anode top cap
PL5727 = 5727 – 100 mAavg, 500 mApeak, 10 Asurge, Tetrode thyratron, 7-pin miniature base

Q

Philips:
Q13-110GU – CRT-type flying-spot scanner, white phosphor, for use in a telecine

QK
Raytheon:
QK329 – Beam-deflection square-law tube for use as a function generator in analog computers. A flat sheet beam is electrostatically deflected across the anode which is partially covered by a parabolically stenciled screen "grid" that acts as the tube's output. Two tubes may be combined to form a 1-quadrant analog multiplier using the equation  where the deflection electrode signals  and  can be obtained directly from a fully balanced resistor bridge

R
Marconi-Osram Valve Company:
R – Early directly heated triode derived from the French TM tube and used by many amateurs in the 1920s

RK
Raytheon:
RK61 – Miniature, gas-filled, directly heated thyratron designed specifically to operate like a vacuum triode below its ignition voltage, allowing it to both amplify analog signals and work as a relaxation oscillator, for use as a self-quenching superregenreative detector up tp 100 MHz in radio control receivers, activating a relay in its anode circuit when a carrier wave is received; 4-pin all-glass wire-ended, 1.4 V, 45 mA filament, Ua=45 V, Ia=1.5 mA.
RK62 – RK61's predecessor, marketed since 1938; this was the major technical development which led to the wartime development of radio-controlled weapons and the parallel development of radio controlled modelling as a hobby.

S

SB
Radio Corporation of America:
SB256 – 256-bit Selectron tube, an early form of digital computer memory

SU
Cossor:
SU25 – EHT rectifier
SU2150 (CV1120) – High-voltage vacuum half-wave rectifier for use in CRT power supplies

T

British General Electric Company:
TuneOn – Early neon-filled bar graph tuning indicator, a glass tube with a short wire anode and a long wire cathode that glows partially; the glow length is proportional to the tube current
TuneOn Button – Early glow modulator used as a budget-priced tuning indicator – a neon lamp whose brightness is proportional to the tube current

Standard Telephones and Cables/Brimar:
Tunograph – Precursor of the "Magic Eye" tuning indicator first introduced in 1933; a tiny CRT with 1-axis electrostatic deflection and a phosphored target at 45° to the electron beam, so the projected green dot can be observed from the side

TH
Compagnie Française Thomson-Houston:
TH9503 – Scripticon, a character generator monoscope for text mode video rendering in early computer monitors, with a square target having letters, digits and symbols patterned on it in an (optionally customer-supplied) 8x8 array. An electron beam selects and scans a character, both by appropriate magnetic deflection, and generates an analog video signal; cf. 4560, CK1414

TM
E.C.&A. Grammont and Compagnie des Lampes (1888):
TM – Vacuum triode for amplification and detection of radio signals, developed in France and made since 1915. It became the standard receiving and amplifying tube of the Entente countries during World War I, and the first mass-produced radio tube. TM's production volume in France alone is estimated at 1.1 million units; in addition, the production of TM and/or improved versions was started in the UK (Marconi–Osram R tube), the Netherlands (Philips E tube), the United States and the Soviet Union (R-5, Russian: Р-5).(ru)
The TM was developed in 1914–15 by the French military telecommunications service Télégraphie Militaire on the initiative of their technical director Gustave-Auguste Ferrié. He and his assistant, physicist Henri Abraham, visited the American laboratories on a number of occasions and were aware of the works of Lee de Forest, Reginald A. Fessenden and Irving Langmuir. They knew that de Forest's Audion and Henry Round's British tube were unreliable and imperfect, and Langmuir's Pliotron was too complex for mass production. They also knew about the latest German developments: Soon after the outbreak of the war, Ferrié received extensive information from a former Telefunken employee, the Frenchman Paul Pichon, who, upon return from a mission from his German employer to gather samples of the latest triodes from the USA, had to surrender himself and the samples to the French. The samples Pichon brought performed poorly due to insufficient vacuum. Following the ideas of Langmuir, Ferrié required the industry to guarantee a high vacuum in series production.
In October 1914, Ferrié, Abraham and François Péri from the radiotelegraph centre in Lyon/La-Doua(fr) went to the light bulb department of Société des Téléphones E.C.&Alexandre Grammont in Lyon to develop with them a triode suitable for mass production. The first prototypes, mere copies of de Forest's Audion, proved to be unreliable and unstable; the next ones were rejected for being too complex. Only the fourth prototype developed in December 1914, with a vertical coaxial system, an Edison screw lamp base for the filament and additional side terminals for anode and grid, was deemed suitable for series production, which started in February 1915 and stopped in October 1915 when it became clear that the vertical structure of "Abraham's Lamp" was too fragile and too many tubes were damaged during transport. Ferrié asked Péri to resolve the problem, and two days later Péri and Jacques Biguet came up with a horizontal coaxial system on the latest four-pin type European 4-pin base. The series production of the Péri/Biguet tubes, named TM after Ferrié's service unit, began in November 1915 under Grammont's Radio Fotos brand; this variant became highly successful, and when demand started to exceed Grammont's production capacity, Compagnie des Lampes (1888) in Ivry-sur-Seine also started production under their Métal brand. Ferrié and Abraham were nominated for the 1916 Nobel Prize in Physics for their work in the field of radio communications.
The TM is a cylindrical/coaxial triode; the directly-heated cathode is a filament made of pure tungsten with a diameter of 60 μm, the anode is a nickel cylinder with a diameter of 10 mm and a length of 15 mm. The dimensions and material of the grid depend on the place of production – the Grammont plant in Lyon used molybdenum wire, the CdL plant in Ivry-sur-Seine used nickel. The diameter of the grid spiral is 4 resp. 4.5 mm. The filament required 4 V and 700 mA to bring it up to white heat; the bright glow prompted Grammont in 1923 to start producing TM tubes with dark blue glass envelopes to protect the eyes of radio operators from the blinding glare, and hide the harmless, but unsightly plaque of metal particles inevitably deposited on the inner wall of the bulb while evacuating during production – but also prevented the triodes' previous, secondary use as light sources, which had earned them their nickname Loupiote ("little lamp").
The TM could be used for their intended purpose, amplifying and detecting signals in radio receivers, or as power oscillators in low-power radio transmitters, and also, by paralleling of several tubes, as AF power amplifiers. The Soviet analogue of the TM, the triode R-5, could withstand anode voltages of up to 500...800 V, and was able to deliver a power of up to 1 W in Class-C mode, but only 40 mW in Class-A mode. A typical single-TM radio receiver of World War I ran at Ua=40 V, Ug=0 V, Ia≈2 mA, gm=400 μS, Ri=25 kΩ, μ=10. With an anode voltage of 160 V and a grid bias of -2 V, the anode current was 3...6 mA, while the reverse grid current reached 1 μA.
The problem of TM tubes was their short service life of 100 hours maximum – if the tube was manufactured in strict accordance with the specifications. In wartime, this was not always possible; due to raw materials supply problems, plants sometimes had to use substandard materials. Such tubes were marked with a cross; they differed from the standard by a higher noise level and were prone to catastrophic failures due to cracks in the glass envelope.

TT
Bendix:
TT8, TT9, TT13, TT15, TT17, TT18, TT20, TT21, TT22 – Chronotron, integrating, balanced-bridge hot-wire/PTC time delay devices

Marconi-Osram Valve Company:
TT11 – Low power VHF transmitting beam tetrode
TT21 – RF power beam-tetrode derived from KT88
TT100 – RF power beam-tetrode

V

VHT
Ferranti:
VHT1 – Pentagrid converter, 1933

Lettered Loctal tubes used in Philco radios
FM1000 – Unusual pentagrid for use as oscillator and coincidence-type phase detector in a PLL FM quadrature detector. The anode signal is loosely coupled into the oscillator tank and pulls it to stay quadrature-phase-locked with the IF; manufactured by Sylvania and used in Philco AM/FM radios of the late 1940s and early 1950s. Predecessor of the nonode approach
XXB – Medium-mu twin triode, also numbered 3C6/XXB
XXD – Medium-mu twin triode, also numbered 14AF7/XXD
XXFM – High-mu triode, twin diode (one shares its cathode with the triode, one with separate cathode), also numbered 7X7/XXFM
XXL – Medium-mu triode, also numbered 7A4/XXL

List of tubes used in 1920s and 1930s radio receivers

Tubes with directly heated cathodes
Used with AC, DC or home-based storage battery power supplies (1927–31)

With a 1.1 Volt DC filament
Used in 1920s home radios. Filaments powered by 1.5 volt dry cells, anodes powered by storage batteries.
WD-11 – triode/detector

With a 2 Volts DC filament
Used in 1930s home radios powered by storage batteries.
19 – Dual power triode – also used in farm radios with 6-volt vibrator power supplies. Early version of octal type 1J6G.
20 – Power triode – Early versions numbered UX-120.
22 – Sharp-cutoff tetrode – Early versions numbered UX-222 or CX-322.
25S – Dual detector diode, medium-mu triode. Identical to type 1B5. Usually numbered 1B5/25S.
30 – Medium-mu triode, An upgraded version of type 01-A – Early versions numbered RCA-230 or CX-330. Can also be used as a power triode. The type 30 was popular amongst amateurs of the day. Early UX4 based version of octal type 1H4G.
31 – Power triode, UX4 based – Early versions numbered RCA-231 or CX-331.
32 – Sharp-cutoff tetrode – Early versions numbered RCA-232 or CX-332.
33 – Power pentode – Early versions numbered RCA-233 or C-333.
34 – Remote-cutoff tetrode – Early versions numbered RCA-234 or CX-334.
49 – Dual-grid power triode, similar to type 46

With a 3.3 Volts DC filament
Used in 1920s home radios powered by dry cells (filaments) and storage batteries (B-plus voltage).
V99 – Low-mu triode. Except for stub-pin bayonet base and pinout, electronically similar to X99
X99 – Similar to V99, but with standard pins and different basing arrangement (pinout).

With a 4 Volts DC filament
3NF – Tube-based "integrated circuit" with 3 triodes and passive components in the same envelope. 4V heater

With a 5 Volts DC filament
Used in 1920s home radios powered by storage batteries.
00-A – Detector triode with a trace of argon. "00-A" is the number used in most tube manuals. Numbers for earlier versions include UX-200-A and CX-300-A (long pins, push-in socket) and UV-200-A (stub pins, bayonet socket).
01-A – All-purpose low-mu triode, used as RF amplifier, detector, AF amplifier and power triode. The most popular tube of the 1920s. "01-A" is the number used for replacements manufactured after 1930 and in tube manuals. Numbers for early versions include UX-201-A and CX-301-A (long pins, push in socket) and UV-201-A (stub pins, bayonet socket).
Note: There were four tubes in the "01" series, each with different current ratings for their filaments. Type 01-A was the most commonly used.
Types UV 201 and UX 201 – 1.0 ampere
Type 01-A (UV 201-A, UX 201-A, etc.) – 250 milliampere
Type UX 201-B – 125 milliampere
Type UX 201-C – 60 milliampere
12-A – Medium-mu triode, often used as detector, audio driver or audio output, but not as an RF amplifier. This type is listed in tube manuals after 1930 for replacements purposes. Also referred to as type 112-A. Many early versions are marked UX-112-A or CX-112-A.
40 – Medium-mu triode – Early versions numbered UX-240. Introduced in 1927, this was an upgraded version of the "01" series. The "01" series had an amplification factor of 8, while type 40 had an amplification factor of 30. (By comparison, the two AC triodes introduced in the same time period – types 26 and 27 – had amplification factors of 8.3 and 9, respectively.) Because this was the highest-amplification triode available, advertising literature of the time lists it as a high-mu triode, although it is now classified as a medium-mu triode. Type 40 had the highest amplification factor of any triode until the introduction in 1932 of diode/triode complex type 2A6, which had an amplification factor of 100. It also had the highest amplification factor of any DC filament triode until the introduction in 1939 of complementary diode/triode complex types 1H5GT (octal) and 1LH4 (Loctal), which both had amplification factors of 65.

Directly AC-heated power tubes
10 – Power triode – Early versions numbered UX-210 or CX-310.
26 – Medium-mu triode, used in early AC radio receivers manufactured in the late 1920s. Used as an RF or AF amplifier, but not as a detector or power output tube – Early versions numbered UX-226 or CX-326.
45 – Power triode – Early versions numbered UX-245 or CX-345.
46 – Dual grid power triode – Grids 1 and 2 connected together for use as push-pull Class-B outputs, Grid 2 and anode connected together for use as single-tube audio driver.
47 – Power pentode – Early versions numbered RCA-247 or C-347.
50 – Power triode – Early versions numbered UX-250 or CX-350.
71-A – Power triode – This type listed in tube manuals after 1930 for replacements purposes. Also referred to as 171-A. Many early versions numbered as UX-171-A or CX-371-A.

Directly AC-heated rectifier tubes
80 – Full-wave rectifier used in early power supplies or battery eliminators (electronically similar to 5Y3G) – Early versions numbered UX-280 or CX-380
81 – Half-wave rectifier – Early versions numbered UX-281 or CX-381.
82 – Full-wave mercury-vapor rectifier
83 – Full-wave mercury-vapor rectifier
83-V – High-vacuum version of type 83, Early UX4 based version of octal type 5V4G.

Tubes with indirectly heated cathodes

With a DC heater
15 – Sharp-cutoff pentode, used in farm radios, in autodyne circuits requiring a separate cathode.
48 – Power tetrode, used in 32-volt farm radios. When two are parallel-connected, they can operate with anode and screen voltages as low as 28 volt.

With a 2.5 Volts heater
Powered by an AC transformer
24 – Sharp-cutoff tetrode, UX5 based, Early versions numbered UY-224 and C-324
24-A – an upgraded version of type 24, see type 24 above. Early versions numbered UY-224A and C-324A
27 – Medium-mu triode, UX5 based, Early versions numbered UY-227 and C-327. The first North American tube with an indirectly heated cathode, which is necessary for detector circuits in AC powered tube radios.
35 – Remote-cutoff tetrode, UX5 based, (Commonly branded as 35/51). Early versions numbered UY-235 or C-335
51 – Similar to 35, see type 35 above. (Commonly branded as 35/51)
53 – Dual power triodes, Class-B, UX7 based, (Except for heater, electronically similar to 6A6 and octal based 6N7)
55 – Dual diode, medium-mu triode, UX6 based, (Except for heater, electronically similar to type 85, and octal based 6V7G, but not to 75)
56 – Medium-mu triode, UX5 based, (Except for heater, electronically similar to 76, and octal based 6P5G)
57 – Sharp-cutoff pentode used in cabinet and mantel radio receivers, UX6 based, (Except for heater, electronically similar to 6C6 and octal based 6J7G, and somewhat similar to type 77)
58 – Remote-cutoff pentode, UX6 based, (Except for heater, electronically similar to 6D6 and octal based 6U7G, but not to 78)
59 – Power pentode, UX7 based.

With a 4 Volts heater
2HF – Tube-based "integrated circuit" with 2 tetrodes and passive components in the same envelope

With a 6.3 Volts heater
Powered by an AC transformer or a vehicle crank battery
1-V – Half-wave rectifier, UX4 based, (often branded as type 1V/6Z3). Early version was KR-1.
36 – Sharp-cutoff tetrode, UX5 based. Early versions numbered RCA-236 or C-336
37 – Medium-mu triode, UX5 based. Early versions numbered RCA-237 or C-337
38 – Power pentode, UX5 based. Early versions numbered RCA-238
39 – Remote-cutoff pentode, UX5 based (Commonly branded as 39/44).
41 – Power pentode, Early UX6 based version of octal type 6K6G, and Loctal type 7B5.
42 – Power pentode, Early UX6 based version of octal type 6F6G, Except for heater, similar to types 2A5 and 18.
44 – Similar to type 39, see type 39 above. (Commonly branded as 39/44).
75 – Dual diode, high-mu triode. Early UX6 based version of octal types 6B6G & 6SQ7GT, and Loctal type 7B6, and 7-pin miniature type 6AV6. Also except for heater, electronically similar to 2A6.
76 – Medium-mu triode, Early UX5 based version of octal type 6P5G.
77 – Sharp-cutoff pentode, Early UX6 based version of octal type 6J7G.
78 – Remote-cutoff pentode, Early UX6 based version of octal type 6K7G.
79 – Dual power triode, Early UX6 based version of octal type 6Y7G.
84 – Full-wave rectifier, often branded as type 84/6Z4. Early UX5 based version of octal type 6X5GT, and Loctal 7Y4, and 7-pin miniature 6X4.
85 – Dual diode, medium-mu triode. Early UX6 based version of octal type 6V7G, except for heater voltage similar to type 55. Also somewhat similar to octal type 6SR7GT and 7-pin miniature types 6BF6.
89 – Power pentode, UX6 based.

With an AC/DC series heater
43 – Power pentode, Early UX6 based version of octal type 25A6G
WG38 – Tube-based "integrated circuit" with 2 pentodes, a triode and passive components in the same envelope

Shielded tubes for Majestic radios
In the early 1930s, the Grigsby-Grunow Company – makers of Majestic brand radios – introduced the first American-made tubes to incorporate metal shields. These tubes had metal particles sprayed onto the glass envelope, copying a design common to European tubes of the time. Early types were shielded versions of tube types already in use. (The shield was connected to the cathode.) The Majestic numbers of these tube types, which are usually etched on the tube's base, have a "G" prefix (for Grigsby-Grunow) and an "S" suffix (for shielded). Later types incorporated an extra pin in the base so that the shield could be connected directly to the chassis.

Replacement versions from other manufacturers, such as Sylvania or General Electric, tend to incorporate the less expensive, form-fitting Goat brand shields that are cemented to the glass envelope.

Grigsby-Grunow did not shield rectifier tubes (except for type 6Y5 listed below) or power output tubes.

Early types based on existing tubes. (Non-shielded versions may be used, but add-on shielding is recommended.)
G-2A7-S – Pentagrid converter
G-2B7-S – Semiremote-cutoff pentode, dual detector diode
G-6A7-S – Pentagrid converter
G-6B7-S – Semiremote-cutoff pentode, dual detector diode
G-6F7-S – Remote-cutoff pentode, medium-mu triode
G-25-S – Medium-mu triode, dual detector diode for 2.0 volt storage battery radios. Glass type 1B5/25S used for replacement.
G-51-S – Remote-cutoff tetrode
G-55-S – Medium-mu triode, dual detector diode
G-56-S – Medium-mu triode
G-56A-S – Medium-mu triode, original version of type 76, but with 400 milliampere heater. (Not to be confused with types 56 or G-56-S, which has a 2.5 volt, 1.0 ampere heater.)
G-57-S – Sharp-cutoff pentode
G-57A-S – Sharp-cutoff pentode, original version of type 6C6, but with 400 milliampere heater. (Not to be confused with types 57 or G-57-S, which has a 2.5 volt, 1.0 ampere heater.)
G-58-S – Remote-cutoff pentode
G-58A-S – Remote-cutoff pentode, original version of type 6D6, but with 400 milliampere heater. (Not to be confused with types 58 or G-58-S, which has a 2.5 volt, 1.0 ampere heater.)
G-85-S – Similar to G-55-S, but with 6.3 volt heater.
Later types
6C7 – Medium-mu triode, dual detector diode, similar to later octal types 6R7 and 6SR7. Seven pin base. (Shield to pin 3.)
6D7 – Sharp-cutoff pentode, identical to type 6C6, but with 7-pin base. (Shield to pin 5.)
6E7 – Remote-cutoff pentode, identical to type 6D6, but with 7-pin base. (Shield to pin 5.)
6Y5 – Dual rectifier diode, similar to type 84/6Z4, but with 6-pin base. (Shield to pin 2.)
Other tubes unique to Majestic radios
G-2-S and G-4-S – Dual detector diodes with common cathodes. The first detector diodes packaged in a separate tube. Forerunners of octal type 6H6. Spray-shielded. Both tubes have 2.5 volt heaters. G-2-S is larger and has a 1.75 ampere heater. Type G-4-S has a 1.0 ampere heater. Later Sylvania replacement type 2S/4S has a 1.35 ampere heater.
2Z2/G-84 – Half-wave rectifier diode with 2.5 volt indirectly heated cathode. A lower-voltage version of type 81. Not interchangeable with type 6Z4/84.
6Z5 – Full-wave rectifier, similar to types 6Z4/84 and 6X5, but with 12.6 volt center-tapped heater.

Rarely used tubes
14 – Similar to 24-A but with a 14 volt, 300 milliampere heater. Used in Philco models 46 and 46E
17 – Similar to 27 but with a 14 volt, 300 milliampere heater. Used in Philco models 46 and 46E
18 – Similar to 2A5 and 42 but with a 14 volt, 300 milliampere heater. No known commercial use.
29 – Wunderlich detector. Known to have been manufactured by Sylvania.
52 – Dual grid power triode similar to types 46 and 49. Has 6.3 volt filament. Most commonly used in early car radios.
64 – Sharp-cutoff tetrode (Except for 400 milliampere heater, similar to 36)
65 – Remote-cutoff pentode (Except for 400 milliampere heater, similar to 39)
67 – Medium-mu triode (Except for 400 milliampere heater, similar 37)
68 – Power pentode (Except for 400 milliampere heater, similar to 38)
69 – Wunderlich detector
70 – Wunderlich detector used in Mission Bell model 19 car radio. Listed in early Philco tube lists.
90 – Wunderlich detector
92 – Wunderlich detector
95 – Original number of type 2A5
181 – Power triode
182-B – Similar to 482-B below.
183 – Similar to 483 below.
213 – Early version of type 80 – Often numbered UX-213
216 – Early version of type 81 – Often numbered as UX-216-B
482-B – Power triode with directly heated cathode. Used in Sparton AC radios, circa 1929. Replacements often numbered 182-B/482-B. Similar to type 71-A, but with higher anode voltage.
483 – Power triode with directly heated cathode. Used in Sparton AC radios, circa 1929. Replacements often numbered 183/483. Similar to type 45, but with a 5.0 volt, 1.25 ampere heater.
485 – Medium-mu triode with indirectly heated cathode. Used in Sparton AC radios, circa 1929. Similar to types 56 and 76, but with a 3.0 volt, 1.25 ampere heater, and lower anode voltage.

List of Russian tubes

Standard tubes
Note: Typecode explained above.

6J1J 6Ж1Ж (954) – Indirectly heated Acorn-type sharp-cutoff pentode, 6.3 V heater
6K1J 6К1Ж (956) – Indirectly heated Acorn-type remote-cutoff pentode, 6.3 V heater
6L1P 6Л1П – Nonode for FM quadrature detection
6N1P 6Н1П – Dual triode, similar to 6DJ8/ECC88
6N2P 6Н2П – Dual triode, similar to 12AX7/ECC83
6N3P 6Н3П (2C51) – Dual triode
6N8S 6Н8С (6SN7/ECC32) – Dual triode
6N9S 6Н9С (6SL7) – Dual triode
6N13S 6Н13С (6AS7G) – Dual power triode
6N14P 6Н14П – Dual RF/VHF triode, similar to ECC84/6CW7
6N23P 6Н23П (6DJ8/ECC88) – Dual triode
6N24P 6Н24П (ECC89/6FC7, 6ES8) – Dual RF/VHF triode for cascode amps
6P1P 6П1П – Power pentode, similar to 6AQ5/EL90
6P3S 6П3С – Beam-power tetrode, similar to 6L6GB
6P3S-E 6П3С-Е – Beam-power tetrode, similar to 5881/6L6WGB
6P6S 6П6С (6V6) – Beam-power tetrode
6P14P 6П14П (6BQ5/EL84) – Power pentode
6P41S 6П41С – Beam power tetrode, designed for TV sets, used in line output stages, similar to 7868.
6P45S 6П45С (6KG6/EL509) – Beam power tetrode, designed for TV sets, used in line output stages. 
6S1J 6С1Ж (955) – Indirectly heated Acorn-type triode, 6.3 V heater
6S19P 6С19П – Output triode

Professional tubes
Note: Typecode explained above.
V1-0.15/55 В1-0.15/55 – 55 kV, 150 mA Half-wave rectifier
VI1-5/20 ВИ1-5/20 – 20 kV, 5 A Half-wave pulse rectifier
G-807 Г-807 – Shortwave transmitter tube (the Russian 807 analogue).
GI-7B ГИ-7Б – Impulse tube
GM-70 ГМ-70 – Modulator tube
GK-71 ГК-71 - RF generation and power amplification, 125 watt pentode, direct heating.
GS-31B ГС-31Б – UHF transmitter tube
GU-29 ГУ-29 – VHF transmitter tube, dual beam tetrode, 20W max. anode dissipation per section.
GU-32 ГУ-32 – VHF transmitter tube, dual beam tetrode, 15W max. anode dissipation per section.
GU-50 ГУ-50 – VHF transmitter pentode, similar to the German LS-50 (no direct U.S. equivalent)
GU-78B ГУ-78Б – VHF transmitter tetrode
I3-70-0.8A И3-70-0.8 – 800 V, 70 A Ignitron
I3-200-1.5A И3-200-1.5 – 1.5 kV, 200 A Ignitron
LP-4 ЛП-4 – Linear trochotron, 26-pin Acorn-type all-glass wire-ended,
SG203K СГ203К – 82 V Voltage reference
SG204K СГ204К – 164 V Voltage reference
TGI1-270/12 ТГИ1-270/12 – 12 kV, 270 A Hydrogen thyratron

Indicator tubes
IN-33 ИН-33 – Neon-filled, planar, dual 105-segment linear glow-transfer plasma bar graph display with three cathode strings, for use in VU meters etc.; similar to BG16101

ITM2-M ИТМ2-М – Four-color phosphored-thyratron latching pixel; 4x4 array of 4 subminiature dual-starter luminescent thyratrons each for the colors red, yellow, green and blue (thus, 5 intensities per color yields 54 = 625 colors), 4x4 matrix of 10-volts sensitive starter electrodes, cubic envelope for easy stacking in both axes, 12-pin all-glass wire-ended, similar to today's RGBA LEDs
ITS1 ИТС1 – Green phosphored-thyratron latching seven-segment display, no decimal point, 5-volts sensitive starter electrodes, all-glass wire-ended, rectangular envelope for easy stacking in both axes
MTX-90 МТХ-90 – Small neon-filled thyratron for use as a latching single-dot indicator, top-viewing, top of envelope acts as a magnifier, all-glass wire-ended, comes with a blob of solder on the end of each wire for rapid installing, like today's ball grid arrays

Compagnie des Lampes (1921, "French Mazda") and Mazda-Belvu
Not to be confused with Compagnie des Lampes (1888, see above) nor with British Mazda (see above).

The 1921 incarnation of La Compagnie des Lampes (since 1953 as Lampe Mazda) made light bulbs and electronic tubes under the French Mazda brand. Many of their tubes were also available from Compagnie Industrielle Française des Tubes Electroniques (CIFTE) under their Mazda-Belvu brand, which otherwise used mostly EIA, RETMA and Mullard–Philips tube designations.

Examples:

Before 1949:
1883 – Indirectly heated, 350 V/125 mA full-wave rectifier, 5 V/1.6 A heater
2XM600 – Directly heated, 10 kV/250 mA half-wave mercury-vapor rectifier, 2.5 V/5 A heater
4Y25 = 807 – Indirectly heated beam tetrode
RETMA tube 6H8G
RCA-800 tubes 879, 884

Since 1949 with a fire pot logo:
RMA tube 2E30
3T20 – Directly heated power triode, graphite anode
3T100 – Directly heated power triode, graphite anode
4Y50 – Indirectly heated beam tetrode
E1 – Electrometer tetrode
E2 – Dual electrometer tetrode
ST130 – 130 V Neon-filled voltage reference

Since 1953 as LAMPE MAZDA:
RMA tube 2G21
4Y100 = 7745 – Dual beam tetrode
RCA-800 tubes 829, 832
927 – Gas-filled phototube
929 – Vacuum phototube
EIA tubes 6196, 6250
E5 – Subminiature electrometer tetrode, all-glass wire-ended

Since 1959 with a Faravahar logo related to Ahura Mazda:
3T50 – Directly heated power triode, thoriated-tungsten filament, graphite anode
4Y75 – Directly heated power triode
RETMA tube 6K8
78A – Directly heated, educational diode
EIA tubes 7233, 7242, 7377, 8418
E6 – Subminiature dual electrometer tetrode, all-glass wire-ended
E7, E9 – Subminiature electrometer pentodes, all-glass wire-ended
Mullard–Philips tubes ECF202, ECL802, ED501, EF816, EL503, EY81F, EY802, GY86, GY802, PY81F
F7024A (Diode), F7024C (Triode), F7024E (Tetrode), F7024L (Pentode) – Set of 4 educational tubes
F9116 – Electrometer tetrode
K25000A1 – Directly heated, 25 kV/70 mA half-wave rectifier, 2.5 V/9 A heater

References and footnotes

Specific items

General literature and data sheets
 Frank Philipse's Tube Datasheet Archive
Mirrors in Brazil • Brazil searchable • Germany • Germany • Hong Kong • Romania • Romania searchable • Sweden • USA
 Tubebooks.org datasheet collection
 Roy J. Tellason's tube datasheet collection
 Klausmobile Russian tube directory
 General Electric Essential Characteristics, 1970

 RCA Receiving Tube Manuals R10 (1932) • RC11 (1933) • RC12 (1934) • RC13 (1937) • RC14 (1942) • RC15 (1948) • RC16 (1951) • RC17 (1954) • RC18 (1956) • RC19 (1959) • RC20 (1960) • RC21 (1961) • RC22 (1963) • RC23 (1964) • RC24 (1965) • RC25 (1966) • RC26 (1968) • RC27 (1970) • RC28 (1971) • RC29 (1973) • RC30 (1975)
 Scanned tube documentation (PDFs): Tubebooks • Frank Philipse • 4tubes
 Sylvania Technical Manual, 1958
 J. P. Hawker (ed), Radio and television servicing, Newnes, London, 1964
Camera tube datasheets
 •  Decoding type numbers
Decoding Valve, Transistor and CRT Numbers
Vacuum Tube Numbering Schemes, Bases & Bulbs
 European tube designation systems:  •  •

See also

External links

Vacuum Tube Data Sheet Locator
Tube Substitution and Characteristics Guide
British virtual thermionic valve museum with good quality pictures and data
Belgian virtual thermionic valve museum with good quality pictures and data
Radio museum
Virtual Valve Museum

Electronics lists
Gas-filled tubes